This is an incomplete list of Acts of the Parliament of Great Britain for the years 1790–1794. For Acts passed up until 1707 see List of Acts of the Parliament of England and List of Acts of the Parliament of Scotland. See also the List of Acts of the Parliament of Ireland to 1700 and the List of Acts of the Parliament of Ireland, 1701–1800.

For Acts passed from 1801 onwards see List of Acts of the Parliament of the United Kingdom. For Acts of the devolved parliaments and assemblies in the United Kingdom, see the List of Acts of the Scottish Parliament, the List of Acts of the Northern Ireland Assembly, and the List of Acts and Measures of the National Assembly for Wales; see also the List of Acts of the Parliament of Northern Ireland.

The number shown after each Act's title is its chapter number. Acts are cited using this number, preceded by the year(s) of the reign during which the relevant parliamentary session was held; thus the Union with Ireland Act 1800 is cited as "39 & 40 Geo 3 c 67", meaning the 67th Act passed during the session that started in the 39th year of the reign of George III and which finished in the 40th year of that reign. Note that the modern convention is to use Arabic numerals in citations (thus "41 Geo 3" rather than "41 Geo III"). Acts of the last session of the Parliament of Great Britain and the first session of the Parliament of the United Kingdom are both cited as "41 Geo 3".

Acts passed by the Parliament of Great Britain did not have a short title; however, some of these Acts have subsequently been given a short title by Acts of the Parliament of the United Kingdom (such as the Short Titles Act 1896).

Before the Acts of Parliament (Commencement) Act 1793 came into force on 8 April 1793, Acts passed by the Parliament of Great Britain were deemed to have come into effect on the first day of the session in which they were passed. Because of this, the years given in the list below may in fact be the year before a particular Act was passed.

1790 (30 Geo. 3)

The seventh session of the 16th Parliament of Great Britain, which met from 21 January 1790 until 10 June 1790.

See:

Public acts

| {{|Land Tax Act 1790|public|2|25-02-1790|repealed=y|archived=n|An Act for granting an Aid to His Majesty by a Land Tax, to be raised in Great Britain, for the Service of the Year One thousand seven hundred and ninety|note4= }}

| {{|Malt Duties Act 1790|public|3|25-02-1790|repealed=y|archived=n|An Act for continuing and granting to His Majesty certain Duties upon Malt, Mum, Cyder, and Perry, for the Service of the Year One thousand seven hundred and ninety.|note4= }}

| {{|Customs Act 1790|public|4|01-04-1790|repealed=y|archived=n|An Act for taking off the Duties upon unwrought Tin exported to any of the Countries beyond the Cape of Good Hope.|note4= }}

| {{|Payment of Creditors (Scotland) Act 1790|public|5|01-04-1790|repealed=y|archived=n|An Act for continuing the Term of so much of an Act made in the Twenty-third Year of the Reign of His present Majesty, as relates to the rendering the Payment of Creditors more equal and expeditious in that Part of Great Britain called Scotland.|note4= }}

| {{|Mutiny Act 1790|public|6|25-02-1790|repealed=y|archived=n|An Act for punishing Mutiny and Desertion, and for the better Payment of the Army and their Quarters.|note4= }}

| {{|Marine Mutiny Act 1790|public|7|25-02-1790|repealed=y|archived=n|An Act for the Regulation of His Majesty's Marine Forces while on Shore.|note4= }}

| {{|Trade Act 1790|public|8|01-04-1790|repealed=y|archived=n|An Act to amend Two Acts made in the Twenty-eighth Year of the Reign of His present Majesty, the one intituled, "An Act for regulating the Trade between the Subjects of His Majesty's Colonies and Plantations in North America and in the West India Islands, and the Countries belonging to the United States of America, and between His Majesty's said Subjects, and the Foreign Islands in the West Indies;" and the other, intituled, "An Act to allow the Importation of Rum, or other Spirits from His Majesty's Colonies or Plantations in the West Indies, into the Province of Quebec, without Payment of Duty, under certain Conditions and Restrictions.|note4= }}

| {{|Militia Pay Act 1790|public|9|01-04-1790|repealed=y|archived=n|An Act for defraying the Charge of Pay and Cloathing of the Militia in that Part of Great Britain called England, for One Year, beginning the Twenty-fifth Day of March One thousand seven hundred and ninety.|note4= }}

| {{|Speaker of House of Commons Act 1790|public|10|01-04-1790|repealed=y|archived=n|An Act for the better Support of the Dignity of the Speaker of the House of Commons, and for disabling the Speaker of the House of Commons for the Time being, from holding any Office or Place of Profit, during Pleasure under the Crown.|note4= }}

| {{|Trade with America Act 1790|public|11|01-04-1790|repealed=y|archived=n|An Act to continue the Laws now in Force, for regulating the Trade between the Subjects of His Majesty's Dominions, and the Inhabitants of the Territories belonging to the United States of America, so far as the same relate to the Trade and Commerce carried on between this Kingdom, and the Inhabitants of the Countries belonging to the said United States.|note4= }}

| {{|Indemnity Act 1790|note1=|public|12|01-04-1790|repealed=y|archived=n|An Act to indemnify such Persons as have omitted to qualify themselves for Offices and Employments, and to indemnify Justices of the Peace or others, who have omitted to register or deliver in their Qualifications within the Time limited by Law, and for giving further Time for those Purposes; and to indemnify Members and Officers in Cities, Corporations, and Borough Towns, whose Admissions have been omitted to be stamped according to Law, or having been stamped, have been lost, or mislaid, and for allowing them Time to provide Admissions duly stamped; to give further Time to such Persons as have omitted to make and file Affidavits of the Execution of Indentures of Clerks to Attornies and Solicitors, and for indemnifying Deputy Lieutenants and Officers of the Militia, who have neglected to transmit Descriptions of their Qualifications to the Clerks of the Peace within the Time limited by Law, and for giving further Time for that Purpose.|note4= }}

| {{|Land Tax (Commissioners) Act 1790|public|13|28-04-1790|repealed=y|archived=n|An Act for appointing Commissioners to put in Execution an Act of this Session of Parliament, intituled, "An Act for granting an Aid to His Majesty by a Land Tax, to be raised in Great Britain, for the Service of the Year One thousand seven hundred and ninety," together with those named in Two former Acts, for appointing Commissioners of the Land Tax.|note4= }}

| {{|Discovery of Longitude at Sea Act 1790|public|14|28-04-1790|repealed=y|archived=n|An Act for continuing the Encouragement and Reward of Persons making certain Discoveries for finding the Longitude at Sea, or making other useful Discoveries and Improvements in Navigation, and for making Experiments relating thereto; and for adding a Commissioner to execute the several Acts for the Discovery of the Longitude at Sea.|note4= }}

| {{|Loans or Exchequer Bills Act 1790|public|15|28-04-1790|repealed=y|archived=n|An Act for raising a certain Sum of Money by Loans or Exchequer Bills, for the Service of the Year One thousand seven hundred and ninety.|note4= }}

| {{|Loans or Exchequer Bills (No. 2) Act 1790|public|16|28-04-1790|repealed=y|archived=n|An Act for raising a further Sum of Money by Loans or Exchequer Bills, for the Service of the Year One thousand seven hundred and ninety.|note4= }}

| {{|Exchequer, etc. Courts (Scotland) Act 1790|public|17|07-05-1790|repealed=y|archived=n|An Act for altering the Time appointed for holding the Summer Session in the Court of Session in Scotland, and for altering Whitsuntide and Lammas Terms in the Court of Exchequer in Scotland.|note4= }}

| {{|Continuance of Laws Act 1790|public|18|28-04-1790|repealed=y|archived=n|An Act to continue the several Laws therein mentioned, relating to encouraging the Manufacture of Leather by lowering the Duty payable upon the Importation of Oak Bark, when the Price of such Bark shall exceed a certain Rate; to the prohibiting the Exportation of Tools and Utensils made use of in the Iron and Steel Manufactures of this Kingdom; and to prevent the seducing of Artificers and Workmen employed in those Manufactures to go into Parts beyond the Seas; and to the ascertaining the Strength of Spirits by Clarke's Hydrometer.|note4= }}

| {{|Papists Act 1790|public|19|28-04-1790|repealed=y|archived=n|An Act for allowing further Time for Enrolment of Deeds and Wills made by Papists, and for Relief of Protestant Purchasers.|note4= }}

| {{|Saint Thomas Church, Bristol Act 1790|public|20|01-04-1790|repealed=y|archived=n|An Act for rebuilding the Parish Church and Tower of St. Thomas, within the City of Bristol.}}

| {{|Norwich Water Act 1790|public|21|01-04-1790|repealed=y|archived=n|An Act for better supplying the City of Norwich, and the Parts adjacent with Water.}}

| {{|Colneis and Carlford Hundreds, Suffolk: Poor Relief Act 1790|public|22|01-04-1790|repealed=y|archived=n|An Act for the better Relief and Employment of the Poor, within the Hundreds of Colneis and Carlford, in the County of Suffolk.}}

| {{|Post Horse Duties Act 1790|public|23|09-06-1790|repealed=y|archived=n|An Act to continue for a limited Time, an Act made in the Twenty-seventh Year of the Reign of His present Majesty, intituled, "An Act to enable the Lord High Treasurer, or Commissioners of the Treasury for the Time being, to let to Farm the Duties granted by an Act made in the Twenty-fifth Year of His present Majesty's Reign, on Horses let to hire for travelling Post, and by Time, to such Persons as should be willing to contract for the same."|note4= }}

| {{|Loans or Exchequer Bills Act 1790|public|24|09-06-1790|repealed=y|archived=n|An Act for enabling His Majesty to raise the Sum of One Million, for the Uses and Purposes therein mentioned.|note4= }}

| {{|Honiton: Improvement Act 1790|public|25|07-05-1790|repealed=y|archived=n|An Act for paving and otherwise improving the Town of Honiton, in the County of Devon.}}

| {{|Auction Duty, etc. Act 1790|note1=|public|26|09-06-1790|repealed=y|archived=n|An Act to exempt Goods and Chattels, imported from the Settlement of Yucatan, in South America, and sold by Auction in Great Britain, from the Duty imposed on such Sales, and for allowing a Drawback of the Duties on Goods exported to Yucatan. |note4= }}

| {{|Settlers in American Colonies Act 1790|public|27|09-06-1790|repealed=y|archived=n|An Act for encouraging new Settlers in His Majesty's Colonies and Plantations in America. |note4= }}

| {{|Importation Act 1790|note1=|public|28|09-06-1790|repealed=y|archived=n|An Act for permitting the Importation of Cashew Gum from His Majesty's West India Islands, upon Payment of the like Duty as is paid upon the Importation of Gum Arabic or Gum Senega. |note4= }}

| {{|Importation and Exportation Act 1790|note1=|public|29|09-06-1790|repealed=y|archived=n|An Act for amending an Act passed in the Twenty-seventh Year of the Reign of His present Majesty, intituled, "An Act for allowing the Importation and Exportation of certain Goods, Wares, and Merchandize, in the Ports of Kingston, Savannah la Mar; Montego Bay, and Santa Lucea, in the Island of Jamaica; in the Port of Saint George, in the Island of Grenada; in the Port of Roseau, in the Island of Dominica; and in the Port of Nassau, in the Island of New Providence, One of the Bahama Islands, under certain Regulations and Restrictions;" and for regulating the Duties on the Importation of Goods and Commodities, the Growth and Production of the Countries bordering on the Province of Quebec. |note4= }}

| {{|Lotteries Act 1790|public|30|10-06-1790|repealed=y|archived=n|An Act for granting to His Majesty a certain Sum of Money, to be raised by a Lottery.|note4= }}

| {{|Silver Plate Act 1790|note1=|public|31|09-06-1790|repealed=y|archived=n|An Act to alter so much of an Act made in the Twelfth Year of the Reign of His late Majesty King George the Second, intituled, "An Act for the better preventing Frauds and Abuses in Gold and Silver Wares;" and also so much of another Act made in the Twenty-fourth Year of the Reign of His present Majesty, intituled, "An Act for granting to His Majesty certain Duties on all Gold and Silver Plate imported, and also certain Duties on all Gold and Silver Wrought Plate made in Great Britain," as relates to the marking of Silver Wares.}}

| {{|Appropriation Act 1790|public|32|10-06-1790|repealed=y|archived=n|An Act for granting to His Majesty a certain Sum of Money out of the Consolidated Fund, for applying certain Monies therein mentioned, for the Service of the Year One thousand seven hundred and ninety; and for further appropriating the Supplies granted in this Session of Parliament.|note4= }}

| {{|Slave Trade Act 1790|public|33|09-06-1790|repealed=y|archived=n|An Act to amend and continue for a limited Time, several Acts of Parliament for regulating the shipping and carrying Slaves in British Vessels from the Coast of Africa.|note4= }}

| {{|American Loyalists, etc. Act 1790|note1=|public|34|09-06-1790|repealed=y|archived=n|An Act for giving Relief to such Persons as have suffered in their Rights and Properties, during the late unhappy Dissensions in America, in consequence of their Loyalty to His Majesty, and Attachment to the British Government; for making Compensation to Persons who furnished Provisions, or other necessary Articles to the Army or Navy in America during the War, or whose Property was used, seized, or destroyed, for the carrying on the Public Service there; and also, for making Compensation to such Persons as have suffered in their Properties, in consequence of the Cession of the Province of East Florida to the King of Spain.|note4= }}

| {{|Parliamentary Elections Act 1790|public|35|10-06-1790|repealed=y|archived=n|An Act to explain and amend an Act passed in the Twentieth Year of the Reign of His present Majesty, touching the Election for Knights of the Shire to serve in Parliament for that Part of Great Britain called England.|note4= }}

| {{|Stage Coaches Act 1790|public|36|10-06-1790|repealed=y|archived=n|An Act to alter, explain, and amend an Act made in the Twenty-eighth Year of the Reign of His present Majesty, intituled, "An Act for limiting the Number of Persons to be carried on the Outside of Stage Coaches or other Carriages," and for regulating the Conduct of the Drivers and Guards thereof.|note4= }}

| {{|Excise Act 1790|note1=|public|37|09-06-1790|repealed=y|archived=n|An Act to continue Two Acts made in the Twenty-eighth and Twenty-ninth Years of the Reign of His present Majesty, for discontinuing for a limited Time the several Duties payable in Scotland upon Low Wines and Spirits, and upon Worts, Wash, and other Liquors there used in the Distillation of Spirits, and for granting to His Majesty other Duties in lieu thereof; and for better regulating the Exportation of British made Spirits from England to Scotland, and from Scotland to England; and to continue for a limited Time an Act made in the Twenty-sixth Year of the Reign of His present Majesty, "To discontinue for a limited Time the Payment of the Duties upon Low Wines and Spirits for Home Consumption, and for granting and securing the due Payment of other Duties in lieu thereof; and for the better Regulation of the making and vending British Spirits; and for discontinuing for a limited Time certain Imposts and Duties upon Rum and Spirits imported from the West Indies," and for amending the said Act made in the Twenty-ninth Year of His present Majesty's Reign. |note4= }}

| {{|Retail of Liquors Act 1790|public|38|10-06-1790|repealed=y|archived=n|An Act for repealing the Duties upon Licences for retailing Wine and Sweets, and upon Licences for retailing distilled Spirituous Liquors, and for granting other Duties in lieu thereof.}}

| {{|Allowances to Distillers (Scotland) Act 1790|public|39|09-06-1790|repealed=y|archived=n|An Act for making Allowances to Distillers of Low Wines and Spirits from Malt, Corn, or Grain in Scotland, in respect to the Duties imposed by an Act made in the Twenty-fourth Year of the Reign of His present Majesty.|note4= }}

| {{|Duty on Tobacco and Snuff Act 1790|public|40|10-06-1790|repealed=y|archived=n|An Act to explain and amend an Act made in the last Session of Parliament, intituled, "An Act for repealing the Duties on Tobacco and Snuff, and for granting new Duties in lieu thereof.|note4= }}

| {{|Importation Act 1790|note1=|public|41|10-06-1790|repealed=y|archived=n|An Act for laying a Duty on the Importation from any of the Provinces in North America of Rape Seed, and all other Seeds used for extracting Oil; and for allowing the Importation from the said Provinces, of Rape Cakes, or Cakes made of Rape Seed, used for Manure, Duty free.|note4= }}

| {{|Importation and Exportation Act 1790|note1=|public|42|10-06-1790|repealed=y|archived=n|An Act to continue for a limited Time certain Provisions contained in an Act made in this present Session of Parliament, intituled, "An Act for indemnifying all Persons who have been concerned in advising or carrying into Execution certain Orders of Council respecting the Importation and Exportation of Corn and Grain; and also, certain Orders issued by the Governor General of His Majesty's Colonies in America, and for preventing Suits in consequence of the same; and for making further Provisions relative thereto, relating to the Importation and Exportation of Corn and Grain; and to authorize His Majesty to permit the Exportation of Corn, Grain, Meal, or Flour, and to prohibit the Importation thereof on the Low Duties.|note4= }}

| {{|Customs Seizures Act 1790|public|43|10-06-1790|repealed=y|archived=n|An Act to authorize the Commissioners of the Customs to defray Charges on Seizures out of His Majesty's Share of Seizures in general.|note4= }}

| {{|Annuity to Doctor Willis Act 1790|public|44|09-06-1790|repealed=y|archived=n|An Act to enable His Majesty to settle a certain Annuity on the Reverend Francis Willis, Doctor of Physic.|note4= }}

| {{|Tontine Annuities Act 1790|public|45|10-06-1790|repealed=y|archived=n|An Act for converting certain Annuities, to be attended with the Benefit of Survivorship in Classes, established by an Act of the last Session of Parliament, into certain Annuities, for an absolute Term of Years, and for enabling the Commissioners of the Treasury to nominate Lives for the Shares so converted.}}

| {{|Annuity (Penn's Descendants) Act 1790|public|46|09-06-1790|repealed=y|archived=n|An Act for settling and securing a certain Annuity for the Use of the Heirs and Descendants of William Penn Esquire, the original Proprietor of the Province of Pennsylvania, in Consideration of the meritorious Services of the said William Penn, and of the Losses which his Family have sustained in consequence of the unhappy Dissensions in America.}}

| {{|Transportation Act 1790|public|47|09-06-1790|repealed=y|archived=n|An Act for enabling His Majesty to authorize His Governor, or Lieutenant Governor of such Places beyond the Seas, to which Felons or other Offenders may be transported, to remit the Sentences of such Offenders.|note4= }}

| {{|Treason Act 1790|public|48|09-06-1790|repealed=y|archived=n|An Act for discontinuing the Judgement which has been required by Law to be given against Women convicted of certain Crimes, and substituting another Judgement in lieu thereof.}}

| {{|Workhouses Act 1790|note1=|public|49|09-06-1790|repealed=y|archived=n|An Act to empower Justices and other Persons to visit Parish Workhouses or Poor Houses, and examine and certify the State and Condition of the Poor therein to the Quarter Sessions.}}

| {{|Land Revenues of the Crown Act 1790|public|50|10-06-1790|repealed=y|archived=n|An Act to continue and amend an Act made in the Twenty-sixth Year of the Reign of His present Majesty, intituled, "An Act for appointing Commissioners to enquire into the State and Condition of the Woods, Forests, and Land Revenues belonging to the Crown, and to sell or alienate Fee Farm and other unimproveable Rents."|note4= }}

| {{|Crown Lands at Catterick and Tunstall, Yorkshire Act 1790|public|51|09-06-1790|repealed=y|archived=n|An Act for divesting out of the Crown the Reversion in Fee of and in certain Hereditaments, heretofore the Estate of Sir Roger Strickland Knight, deceased, in Catterick and Tunstall, in the County of York, and for vesting the same in the several Persons entitled to the said Hereditaments; and for extinguishing and destroying a certain Term of One hundred Years, for which the said Hereditaments were limited in Trust for His late Majesty King George the First, His Heirs and Successors.}}

| {{|Ouse (Sussex): Navigation Act 1790|public|52|28-04-1790|repealed=y|archived=n|An Act for improving, continuing, and extending the Navigation of the River Ouse, from Lewes Bridge, at the Town of Lewes, to Hammer Bridge, in the Parish of Cuckfield, and to the Extent of the said Parish of Cuckfield; and also of a Branch of the said River to Shortbridge, in the Parish of Fletching, in the County of Sussex.}}

| {{|Westminster: Improvements Act 1790|public|53|09-06-1790|repealed=y|archived=n|An Act to alter, explain, amend, and render more effectual, several Acts made for paving, cleansing, and lighting the Squares, Streets, Lanes, and other Places within the City and Liberty of Westminster, and Parts adjacent, and for putting certain Streets therein mentioned, commonly called Optional Streets, under the Management of Parochial Committees, subject to the Control of the Commissioners appointed by, or in pursuance of the said several Acts; and for removing and preventing Nuisances, Annoyances, Obstructions, and Encroachments, in the said Streets and other Places, and for other Purposes.}}

| {{|Westminster Fish Market Act 1790|public|54|09-06-1790|repealed=y|archived=n|An Act for vesting the Estate and Property of the Trustees of Westminster Fish Market in the Marine Society, for the Purposes therein mentioned; and for discontinuing the Powers of the said Trustees.|note4= }}

| {{|Hubberston and Pill, Pembroke: Docks and Piers Act 1790|public|55|09-06-1790|repealed=y|archived=n|An Act to enable Sir William Hamilton, Knight of the Most Honourable Order of the Bath, his Heirs and Assigns, to make and provide Quays, Docks, Piers, and other Erections, and to establish a Market with proper Roads and Avenues thereto respectively, within the Manor or Lordship of Hubberstone and Pill, in the County of Pembroke.}}

| {{|Erewash Canal Act 1790|public|56|01-04-1790|repealed=y|archived=n|An Act to alter and amend an Act passed in the last Session of Parliament, for making and maintaining a Navigable Canal from, or from near to Cromford Bridge, in the County of Derby, to join and communicate with the Erewash Canal, at or near Langley Bridge, and also a Collateral Cut from the said intended Canal, at or near Codnor Park Mill, to or near Pinxton Mill, in the said County.}}

| {{|Ipswich and Stowmarket Navigation Act 1790|public|57|01-04-1790|repealed=y|archived=n|An Act for making and maintaining a Navigable Communication between Stowmarket and Ipswich, in the County of Suffolk.}}

| {{|Edington, Somerset Drainage, etc. Act 1790|public|58|28-04-1790|repealed=y|archived=n|An Act for draining, dividing, and enclosing certain Moors, Commons, or Waste Lands, called Edington, otherwise Burtle Moor, East Heath, West Heath, and Clyde Batch, within the Hamlet of Edington, and Parish of Moorlinch, in the County of Somerset.}}

| {{|Anglesey: Drainage Act 1790|public|59|28-04-1790|repealed=y|archived=n|An Act for more effectually embanking the Marsh called Malldraeth and Corsddaugau, in the County of Anglesey, and draining and preserving the same, and the enclosed Low Lands contiguous thereto.}}

| {{|Stourbridge and Birmingham and Fazeley Canal Act 1790|public|60|07-05-1790|repealed=y|archived=n|An Act for effectually carrying into Execution Two Acts of the Sixteenth and Twenty-fifth Years of His present Majesty, for making and maintaining a Navigable Canal from the Stourbridge Navigation to the Birmingham, and Birmingham and Fazely Canal Navigations, in the Counties of Worcester and Stafford.}}

| {{|Plymouth Dock to Torpoint: Ferry Act 1790|public|61|07-05-1790|repealed=y|archived=n|An Act for authorizing and enabling the Right Honourable George Earl of Mount Edgcumbe, and Reginald Pole Carew Esquire, to establish and maintain a Common Ferry over and across the River Tamer, between a certain Place North of Plymouth Dock, in the Parish of Stoke Damarel, in the County of Devon and Torpoint, in the Parish of Antony Saint Jacob, otherwise Antony in the East, in the County of Cornwall.}}

| {{|Truro: Streets Act 1790|public|62|07-05-1790|repealed=y|archived=n|An Act for paving, cleansing, lighting, and widening the Streets, Lanes, and Passages; for removing and preventing Encroachments, Nuisances, and Annoyances; and for regulating the Porters and Drivers of Carts within the Borough of Truro, and Part of the adjoining Parishes in the County of Cornwall.}}

| {{|Bradford, Yorkshire: Water Supply Act 1790|public|63|07-05-1790|repealed=y|archived=n|An Act for preserving the Works made for supplying the Town of Bradford, in the County of York, and Part of the Township of Horton, in the Parish of Bradford aforesaid, with Water; for the more easy Recovery of the Rents for the said Water, and to enable the Proprietors thereof to borrow Money for the improving such Works.}}

| {{|Ramsgate: Chapel of Ease Act 1790|public|64|07-05-1790|repealed=y|archived=n|An Act for establishing a Chapel at Ramsgate, in the Parish of Saint Laurence, in the Isle of Thanet, in the County of Kent, as a Chapel of Ease to the Church of the same Parish.}}

| {{|Leeds and Liverpool Canal Act 1790|public|65|09-06-1790|repealed=y|archived=n|An Act to enable the Company of Proprietors of the Canal Navigation from Leeds to Liverpool, to vary the Line of the said Canal Navigation, and to raise a further Sum of Money for the Purpose of completing the said Canal Navigation, and for other Purposes.}}

| {{|Peterborough: Streets Act 1790|public|66|09-06-1790|repealed=y|archived=n|An Act for paving and otherwise improving the City and Township of Peterborough.}}

| {{|Durham: Streets Act 1790|public|67|09-06-1790|repealed=y|archived=n|An Act for paving, cleansing, lighting, watching, and regulating the Streets, Lanes, Ways, and Public Passages and Places within the City of Durham and Borough of Framwelgate, and the Suburbs thereof, and Streets thereto adjoining; for removing and preventing Nuisances, Annoyances, Encroachments, and Obstructions therein; for widening and rendering more commodious several of the said Streets, Lanes, Ways, and Public Passages and Places; and for regulating and improving the Markets within the said City and Suburbs.}}

| {{|Leeds: Water Supply Act 1790|public|68|09-06-1790|repealed=y|archived=n|An Act for better supplying the Town and Neighbourhood of Leeds, in the County of York, with Water, and for more effectually lighting and cleansing the Streets and other Places within the said Town and Neighbourhood; and removing and preventing Nuisances, Annoyances, Encroachments, and Obstructions therein.}}

| {{|Saint James Church, Clerkenwell Act 1790|public|69|09-06-1790|repealed=y|archived=n|An Act for amending and enlarging the Powers of and rendering more effectual an Act made in the Twenty-eighth Year of the Reign of His present Majesty, intituled, "An Act for pulling down the Church of Saint James at Clerkenwell, in the County of Middlesex, and for building a new Church, and making a new Church Yard or Cemetery in the said Parish, with convenient Avenues and Passages thereto;" and for purchasing Pentonville Chapel, and making the same a Chapel of Ease to the said Church.}}

| {{|Saint James, Westminster: Improvement Act 1790|public|70|09-06-1790|repealed=y|archived=n|An Act to amend an Act of the last Session of Parliament for providing an additional Burial Ground for the Parish of Saint James, Westminster, and erecting a Chapel adjoining thereto; and also a House for the Residence of a Clergyman to officiate in burying the Dead.}}

| {{|Saint John Church, Hackney Act 1790|public|71|09-06-1790|repealed=y|archived=n|An Act for taking down the Church and Tower belonging to the Parish of Saint John at Hackney, in the County of Middlesex; and for building another Church and Tower for the Use of the said Parish; and for making an additional Cemetery or Church Yard.}}

| {{|Banbury Church Act 1790|public|72|09-06-1790|repealed=y|archived=n|An Act for taking down the Church, Chancel, and Tower, belonging to the Parish of Banbury, in the County of Oxford, and for re-building the same.}}

| {{|Forth and Clyde and Monkland Canal Act 1790|public|73|09-06-1790|repealed=y|archived=n|An Act for forming a Junction between the Forth and Clyde Navigation, and the Monkland Navigation, and for altering, enlarging, and explaining, several former Acts passed, for making and maintaining the said Navigations.}}

| {{|Waterbeach Level: Drainage Act 1790|public|74|09-06-1790|repealed=y|archived=n|An Act to alter and amend an Act made in the Fourteenth Year of the Reign of His late Majesty King George the Second, intituled, "An Act for the effectual Draining and Preservation of Waterbeach Level, in the County of Cambridge, and to establish an Agreement made between the Lord of the Manor of Waterbeach cum Denny, and the Commoners within the said Manor."}}

| {{|Severn: Navigation Act 1790|public|75|09-06-1790|repealed=y|archived=n|An Act to enable the Company of Proprietors of the Staffordshire and Worcestershire Navigation to improve the Navigation of the River Severn from Stourport, in the County of Worcester, to a Place called Diglis, near the City of Worcester.}}

| {{|Hans Town, Chelsea: Improvement Act 1790|public|76|09-06-1790|repealed=y|archived=n|An Act for forming and keeping in Repair the Streets and other Public Passages and Places within a certain District in the Parish of Saint Luke, Chelsea, in the County of Middlesex, called Hans Town, and for otherwise improving the same.}}

| {{|Coventry: Streets Act 1790|public|77|09-06-1790|repealed=y|archived=n|An Act for the better paving, cleansing, lighting, and watching, the City of Coventry, and the Suburbs thereof; and removing and preventing Nuisances and Annoyances therein; and for regulating the Public Wells and Pumps within the said City and Suburbs.}}

| {{|Newcastle and Sunderland: Coals Act 1790|public|78|21-01-1790|repealed=y|archived=n|An Act to continue an Act made in the Sixth Year of His present Majesty's Reign, intituled, "An Act to regulate the Loading of Ships with Coals in the Ports of Newcastle and Sunderland.}}

| {{|East Grinstead Church Act 1790|public|79|09-06-1790|repealed=y|archived=n|An Act for re-building the Parish Church of East Grinstead, in the County of Sussex.}}

| {{|Streatham: Poor Relief Act 1790|public|80|09-06-1790|repealed=y|archived=n|An Act for providing a Workhouse for, and for the better Relief and Employment of the Poor of the Parish of Streatham, in the County of Surrey; and for appointing an additional Overseer for the better Government of the Poor of the said Parish.}}

| {{|Manchester: Poor Relief Act 1790|public|81|09-06-1790|repealed=y|archived=n|An Act for providing a new Poor House for, and for the better Relief and Government of the Poor of the Township of Manchester, in the County of Lancaster.}}

| {{|Merthyr Tidvill to Cardiff Canal Act 1790|public|82|09-06-1790|repealed=y|archived=n|An Act for making and maintaining a Navigable Canal from Merthyr Tidvile, to and through a Place called The Bank, near the Town of Cardiff, in the County of Glamorgan.}}

| {{|Ouse: Navigation Act 1790|public|83|07-05-1790|repealed=y|archived=n|An Act for empowering Persons navigating Boats, Barges, and other Vessels, in the River Ouze, in the County of Norfolk, to hale or tow with Horses or other Beasts on the Banks or Sea Walls of the said River, and for making Satisfaction to the Owners of the said Banks or Sea Walls.}}

| {{|Liston Essex Roads Act 1790|public|84|01-04-1790|repealed=y|archived=n|An Act to empower William Henry Campbell Esquire, to shut up a Road and Foot Paths in the Parish of Liston, in the County of Essex; and to oblige him to make and keep in Repair for the future, another Road and Foot Path in lieu thereof.}}

| {{|Norwich to Bixley Roads Act 1790|public|85|01-04-1790|repealed=y|archived=n|An Act for continuing an Act of the Tenth Year of the Reign of His present Majesty, for amending the Road from Saint Stephen's Gate, in the City of Norwich, to Block Hill, in Trowse, at the Angle, where the Road divides to Bixley and Kirby, in the County of Norfolk.}}

| {{|Norwich Roads Act 1790|public|86|01-04-1790|repealed=y|archived=n|An Act for continuing an Act of the Ninth Year of the Reign of His present Majesty, for amending the Road from Bishopsgate Bridge, in the City of Norwich, to a Stone formerly called the Two Mile Stone, where the Norwich Road joins the Caister Causeway, Two Miles and a Half short of the Town of Great Yarmouth.}}

| {{|Norfolk Roads Act 1790|public|87|01-04-1790|repealed=y|archived=n|An Act for continuing an Act of the Twelfth Year of His present Majesty, for repairing and widening the Road from Berstreet Gates, in the City of Norwich, to New Buckenham, in the County of Norfolk.}}

| {{|Chester and Derby Roads Act 1790|public|88|01-04-1790|repealed=y|archived=n|An Act to enlarge the Term and Powers of an Act passed in the Tenth Year of the Reign of His present Majesty, for repairing, widening, and altering the Road from Macclesfield, in the County of Chester, to the Turnpike Road at Randle Carr Lane Head, in Fernilee, in the County of Derby, leading to Chapel in the Frith.}}

| {{|Hertfordshire and Huntingdonshire Roads Act 1790|public|89|01-04-1790|repealed=y|archived=n|An Act for continuing the Term, and altering and enlarging the Powers of certain Acts of Parliament, for repairing the Roads from Royston, in the County of Hertford, to Wandesford Bridge, in the County of Huntingdon, and from the Town of Huntingdon to the Causeway at or near the West End of the Town of Somersham, in the County of Huntingdon, so far as relates to the Middle and South Divisions, and separate District of the said Road.}}

| {{|Kent Roads Act 1790|public|90|01-04-1790|repealed=y|archived=n|An Act for enlarging the Term and Powers of an Act of the Eighth Year of His present Majesty, for amending, widening, and keeping in Repair, several Roads leading to and through the Town of Goudhurst, in the County of Kent.}}

| {{|Pembroke Roads Act 1790|public|91|01-04-1790|repealed=y|archived=n|An Act for enlarging the Term of an Act of the Eleventh Year of His present Majesty, for repairing, widening, and keeping in Repair, several Roads leading from Tavernspite to the Towns of Pembroke and Tenby, and to Hubberston Haking, in the County of Pembroke.}}

| {{|Leicester Roads Act 1790|public|92|01-04-1790|repealed=y|archived=n|An Act to enlarge the Term and Powers of an Act passed in the Twenty-eighth Year of the Reign of His present Majesty, for repairing and widening the Road from the Leicester and Welford Turnpike Road, in the Counties of Leicester and Northampton, near Foston Lane, to the Turnpike Road leading from Hinckley to Ashby de la Zouch, in the said County of Leicester; and for repairing and widening Two Pieces of Road, called Hunt's Lane and Wood Lane, in the Parishes of Desford and Newbold Verdon.}}

| {{|Fife Roads Act 1790|public|93|01-04-1790|repealed=y|archived=n|An Act for making and repairing the Road from Newmiln Bridge, by Foodie's Mill, Inverkeithing, Aberdour, Kirkcaldy, Gallatown, and Cameron Bridge, to Craill, and other Roads in the County of Fife.}}

| {{|Cambridge Roads Act 1790|public|94|01-04-1790|repealed=y|archived=n|An Act for enlarging the Term of several Acts made for repairing the Roads from Stump Cross to Newmarket Heath, and from Stump Cross aforesaid, to the End of the Town of Trumpington next to Shelford, and from Shelford Pound to Wittlesford; and for making more effectual Provision for repairing the said Roads, and also One Mile of the Road between Trumpington and Cambridge, commencing at the South End of Trumpington aforesaid; and for amending the Road from Chesterford Bridge, to the End of Wittlesford, next to Shelford, all in the County of Cambridge.}}

| {{|Dorset Roads Act 1790|public|95|01-04-1790|repealed=y|archived=n|An Act to enlarge the Term and Powers of so much of an Act made in the Ninth Year of the Reign of His present Majesty as relates to the amending, widening, altering, clearing, and keeping in Repair several Roads leading from the Borough of Dorchester, in the County of Dorset.}}

| {{|Wiltshire Roads Act 1790|public|96|01-04-1790|repealed=y|archived=n|An Act for enlarging the Terms and altering the Powers of Two Acts made in the Sixteenth Year of the Reign of His late Majesty, and in the Ninth Year of the Reign of His present Majesty, for repairing the Roads leading from Marlborough, through West Kennett, to Sheppard's Shord; and from the Hare and Hounds in Beckhampton, to the Top of Cherrill Hill; and from the Town of Avebury, to the Cross Way at Beckhampton; and from the Turnpike Gate at Avebury, to Wroughton; and from the North Side of Swindon, to the Carpenter's Arms in Blunsden, in the County of Wilts; and for diverting, turning, and altering Part of the said Roads; and for repairing, and widening the Road on the West Side of the Three Barrows, from the Direction Post there, on the New Road leading from Beckhampton to Devizes, to the Distance of One Mile from the said Direction Post Westward.}}

| {{|Surrey and Sussex Roads Act 1790|public|97|01-04-1790|repealed=y|archived=n|An Act for continuing the Term and enlarging, altering, and amending the Powers of an Act made in the Tenth Year of His present Majesty, for repairing, widening, and keeping in Repair the Road from New Chappell, in the County of Surrey, over Copthorn, in the County of Sussex, through Lindfield, to the Town of Ditchling, up to the Top of Ditchling Bost Hills, in the said County of Sussex.}}

| {{|Wiltshire Roads (No. 2) Act 1790|public|98|01-04-1790|repealed=y|archived=n|An Act for repairing and widening the Road from Rowde Ford to Red Hill, and from Chittoe Heath to the Town of Calne, in the County of Wilts; and for repealing Three Acts made in the Second and Twenty-fifth Years of the Reign of His late Majesty King George the Second, and in the Twenty-third Year of His present Majesty, for repairing the Highways between Sheppard's Shord and Horsley Upright Gate, leading down Bagdown Hill, in the County of Wilts, and other ruinous Parts of the Highways thereunto adjacent.}}

| {{|Yorkshire Roads Act 1790|public|99|01-04-1790|repealed=y|archived=n|An Act for continuing the Term and altering and enlarging the Powers of certain Acts made for repairing the Road from Keighley, in the West Riding of the County of York, to Kirkby in Kendall, in the County of Westmorland; so far as relates to such Part of the said Road as lies within the County of York.}}

| {{|Stafford Roads Act 1790|public|100|28-04-1790|repealed=y|archived=n|An Act for making, amending, and keeping in Repair the Road, from Fosbrook, in the Parish of Dillorn, through Dillorn, and from thence to or near to Chedleton, in the County of Stafford.}}

| {{|Bromsgrove to Birmingham Road Act 1790|public|101|28-04-1790|repealed=y|archived=n|An Act to enlarge the Terms and Powers of Three several Acts made in the Thirteenth Year of the Reign of King George the First, the Twenty-first Year of the Reign of King George the Second, and the Eleventh Year of the Reign of His present Majesty, for repairing the Road leading from the Town of Bromsgrove, in the County of Worcester, to the Town of Birmingham, in the County of Warwick.}}

| {{|Worcester Salop and Stafford Roads Act 1790|public|102|28-04-1790|repealed=y|archived=n|An Act for making, amending, widening, and keeping in Repair, a Road from Eve Hill near Dudley, to the New Inn, in the Parish of Pattingham, and from the Turnpike Road at or near Street End, in the Parish of Kingswinford, to the Turnpike Road leading from Dudley to Wolverhampton, in the Counties of Worcester, Salop, and Stafford.}}

| {{|Huntingdonshire Roads Act 1790|public|103|28-04-1790|repealed=y|archived=n|An Act to continue the Term and alter and enlarge the Powers of an Act of the Tenth Year of His present Majesty, for repairing the Road from Biggleswade, in the County of Bedford, through Bugden and Alconbury, to the Top of Alconbury Hill, and from Bugden to Huntingdon, and from Cross Hall to Great Stoughton Common, in the County of Huntingdon; and also the Road leading out of the aforesaid Road at or near the Ferry House, in the Parish of Tempsford, to and through Little Barford, Eynesbury, and Saint Neots, to the Turnpike Road at the End of Cross Hall Lane.}}

| {{|Norfolk Roads Act 1790|public|104|07-05-1790|repealed=y|archived=n|An Act for continuing and amending an Act of the Tenth Year of His present Majesty, for amending and widening the Road from Saint Stephen's Gate, in the County of the City of Norwich to the Windmill in the Town of Watton, in the County of Norfolk.}}

| {{|Linlithgow Roads Act 1790|public|105|07-05-1790|repealed=y|archived=n|An Act to continue the Term and alter the Powers of so much of Two Acts made in the Twenty-fifth and Thirty-first Years of the Reign of His late Majesty, for repairing several Roads in the Counties of Linlithgow and Stirling, as relates to the Roads lying within the County of Linlithgow.}}

| {{|Berkshire Roads Act 1790|public|106|07-05-1790|repealed=y|archived=n|An Act for enlarging the Term and Powers of an Act passed in the Eighth Year of the Reign of His present Majesty King George the Third, for repairing and widening the Road from the Mayor's Stone in Abingdon, in the County of Berks, through Cumner, to the ancient Horse Road at Swinford, in the said County.}}

| {{|Staffordshire Roads Act 1790|public|107|09-06-1790|repealed=y|archived=n|An Act to continue the Term, and alter and enlarge the Powers of an Act passed in the Ninth Year of the Reign of His present Majesty, for repairing and widening the Road from Cheadle to Botham House, and from thence to Butterton Moor End, in the County of Stafford.}}

| {{|Linlithgow and Stirling Roads Act 1790|public|108|09-06-1790|repealed=y|archived=n|An Act to continue the Term and alter the Powers of so much of Two Acts made in the Twenty-fifth and Thirty-first Years of the Reign of His late Majesty for repairing several Roads in the Counties of Linlithgow and Stirling, as relates to the Roads lying within the County of Stirling; and for repairing the Road from Loanhead to Saint Ninian's, in the said County of Stirling.}}

| {{|Stirling and Dumbarton Roads Act 1790|public|109|09-06-1790|repealed=y|archived=n|An Act for repairing several Roads in the Counties of Stirling and Dumbarton.}}

| {{|Denbigh and Flint Roads Act 1790|public|110|09-06-1790|repealed=y|archived=n|An Act for more effectually amending, widening, and keeping in Repair, the Road from the Town of Denbigh, to the Turnpike Road between Northop and Holywell, and from Afton Wen, to the Town of Mold, in the Counties of Denbigh and Flint.}}

| {{|Salop Roads Act 1790|public|111|09-06-1790|repealed=y|archived=n|An Act for enlarging the Term and Powers of an Act passed in the Ninth Year of the Reign of His present Majesty King George the Third, for repairing and widening the Road from the End of the Turnpike Road in Shawbury, in the County of Salop, to Drayton in Hales, in the said County, and from thence to Newcastle under Line, in the County of Stafford, and from Shawbury aforesaid, to the Turnpike Road in High Ercall, in the said County of Salop, and from Shawbury aforesaid, to Wem, in the said County, and from thence to the Turnpike Road in Sandford, in the said County.}}

| {{|Stafford and Chester Roads Act 1790|public|112|09-06-1790|repealed=y|archived=n|An Act for enlarging the Term and Powers of an Act passed in the Tenth Year of the Reign of His present Majesty, for repairing and widening the Road from Tunstall, in the County of Stafford, to Bosley, in the County of Chester, and from Great Chell to Shelton, in the said County of Stafford.}}

| {{|Derby Nottinghamshire Roads Act 1790|public|113|09-06-1790|repealed=y|archived=n|An Act to enlarge the Term and Powers of an Act made in the Fourth Year of the Reign of His present Majesty, for repairing, widening, and keeping in Repair, the High Roads leading from Alfreton, in the County of Derby, through Carter Lane, to a certain Place in the Town of Mansfield, called Stockwell, and from the Bridle Gate, at the Division of the Liberties of Blackwell and Hucknall, through the Town of Sutton in Ashfield, to the Mansfield and Newark Turnpike, at or near Python Hill, in the Forest of Sherwood, in the County of Nottingham.}}

| {{|Bedford and Buckinghamshire Roads Act 1790|public|114|09-06-1790|repealed=y|archived=n|An Act for amending, widening, and keeping in Repair the Road from the East End of Bromham Bridge, in the County of Bedford, to the Turnpike Road leading from Wellingborough to Olney, in the County of Bucks; and also the Road from the said Turnpike Road at or near the South End of the Town of Olney aforesaid to the Turnpike Road leading from Northampton to Newport Pagnell, in the same County.}}

| {{|Hertford and Bedford Roads Act 1790|public|115|09-06-1790|repealed=y|archived=n|An Act for continuing the Term, and enlarging the Powers of certain Acts, for repairing the Road from the Town of Hitchin, through Shefford, to the Turnpike Road from Saint Alban's to Bedford, and other Roads therein mentioned, in the Counties of Hertford and Bedford.}}
}}

Private and personal acts

| {{|Linton (Yorkshire, West Riding) inclosure.|private|2|21-01-1790|note3=|repealed=n|archived=n|}}

| {{|Naturalization of Gottlob Schusler.|private|3|21-01-1790|note3=|repealed=n|archived=n|}}

| {{|James Money's estate: vesting in trustees to be sold, and purchase of other hereditaments to be settled in lieu.|private|4|21-01-1790|note3=|repealed=n|archived=n|}}

| {{|Francis Rybot's divorce from Alicia Fowler, and other provisions.|private|5|21-01-1790|note3=|repealed=n|archived=n|}}

| {{|Old Buckenham (Norfolk) inclosure.|private|6|21-01-1790|note3=|repealed=n|archived=n|}}

| {{|Burton Leonard (Yorkshire) inclosure.|private|7|21-01-1790|note3=|repealed=n|archived=n|}}

| {{|Harewood (Yorkshire) inclosure.|private|8|21-01-1790|note3=|repealed=n|archived=n|}}

| {{|Dibden (Hampshire) inclosure.|private|9|21-01-1790|note3=|repealed=n|archived=n|}}

| {{|North Collingham (Nottinghamshire) inclosure.|private|10|21-01-1790|note3=|repealed=n|archived=n|}}

| {{|Killingwoth Moor (Northumberland) inclosure.|private|11|21-01-1790|note3=|repealed=n|archived=n|}}

| {{|Thomas Watson's name.|private|12|21-01-1790|note3=|repealed=n|archived=n|}}

| {{|Naturalization of George Paetsch, John Garbers, and John Pasteur.|private|13|21-01-1790|note3=|repealed=n|archived=n|}}

| {{|Naturalization of Julius Bierbaum.|private|14|21-01-1790|note3=|repealed=n|archived=n|}}

| {{|Naturalization of Noah Turmine's.|private|15|21-01-1790|note3=|repealed=n|archived=n|}}

| {{|Naturalization of Matthias Koops.|private|16|21-01-1790|note3=|repealed=n|archived=n|}}

| {{|Terrington St. Clement's and Terrington St. John's (Norfolk) embanking and inclosure.|private|17|21-01-1790|note3=|repealed=n|archived=n|}}

| {{|Deverill Longbridge, Hussey Deverill and Monkton Deverill (Wiltshire): division and allotment of open and commonable lands.|private|18|21-01-1790|note3=|repealed=n|archived=n|}}

| {{|Dormstone (Worcestershire) inclosure.|private|19|21-01-1790|note3=|repealed=n|archived=n|}}

| {{|Harby (Leicestershire) inclosure.|private|20|21-01-1790|note3=|repealed=n|archived=n|}}

| {{|Willem Blaauw naturalization.|private|21|21-01-1790|note3=|repealed=n|archived=n|}}

| {{|Mickleover (Derbyshire) inclosure.|private|22|21-01-1790|note3=|repealed=n|archived=n|}}

| {{|Road Common (Somerset, Wiltshire) inclosure.|private|23|21-01-1790|note3=|repealed=n|archived=n|}}

| {{|Bleaton (Westmorland) inclosure.|private|24|21-01-1790|note3=|repealed=n|archived=n|}}

| {{|Cotgrave (Nottinghamshire) inclosure.|private|25|21-01-1790|note3=|repealed=n|archived=n|}}

| {{|Polebrook (Northamptonshire) inclosure.|private|26|21-01-1790|note3=|repealed=n|archived=n|}}

| {{|Duke of Newcastle's estate: laying out settled money in the purchase of estates, to be settled as his present estates.|private|27|21-01-1790|note3=|repealed=n|archived=n|}}

| {{|Richard Wilson's estate: sale of estates in Yorkshire, others to be settled in lieu.|private|28|21-01-1790|note3=|repealed=n|archived=n|}}

| {{|Reverend Stephen White's estate: vesting estates in London, Surrey, Middlesex and Hertfordshire in trustees, to be sold, purchase of other land to be settled in lieu and power to grant building and repairing leases.|private|29|21-01-1790|note3=|repealed=n|archived=n|}}

| {{|Sir John Riddell, change of surname to Buchanan, and Archibald Buchanan's estate:|note1= vesting estates in Bedfordshire and Buckinghamshire in trustees to be sold for discharging incumbrances and for purchasing land to be settled in lieu, and for other purposes.|private|30|21-01-1790|note3=|repealed=n|archived=n|}}

| {{|Reverend John Templer's estate: exchange of settled estate in Kent for another to be settled in lieu.|private|31|21-01-1790|note3=|repealed=n|archived=n|}}

| {{|Margaret Lawrie's estate: settling Quintinespie, Kirklands, Redcastle and others (Kirkcudbright) in fee tail and vesting Mool and Cairn (Wigtown) in fee simple.|private|32|21-01-1790|note3=|repealed=n|archived=n|}}

| {{|Thomas Estcourt's estate: vesting estates in Gloucestershire and Wiltshire in trustees, to be sold and exchanged, for the purchase of other estates to be settled in lieu and for the discharge of incumbrances.|private|33|21-01-1790|note3=|repealed=n|archived=n|}}

| {{|William Colbourn and Eton College: exchange of advowsons of united rectories of Creeting All Saints and Creeting Saint Olaves (Suffolk) for advowson of rectory of East Wretham (Norfolk).|private|34|21-01-1790|note3=|repealed=n|archived=n|}}

| {{|William Colbourne and King's College, Cambridge: exchange of advowson of rectory of Hepworth (Suffolk), and land in Hepworth, for advowson of rectory of West Wretham (Norfolk).|private|35|21-01-1790|note3=|repealed=n|archived=n|}}

| {{|Duke of Norfolk's estate: vesting estates in Sussex and settling others in lieu.|private|36|21-01-1790|note3=|repealed=n|archived=n|}}

| {{|Duke of Bolton's estate: vesting Fisherton Delamere (Wiltshire) in trustees for the purpose of effecting decrees of the Court of Chancery.|private|37|21-01-1790|note3=|repealed=n|archived=n|}}

| {{|Earl of Abergavenny's estate: confirmation of a lease and power to grant further leases.|private|38|21-01-1790|note3=|repealed=n|archived=n|}}

| {{|Richard and Katherine Hatchett's estate: vesting estates in Cheshire and Salop. and settling others in lieu.|private|39|21-01-1790|note3=|repealed=n|archived=n|}}

| {{|Bowbrickhill and Fenny Stratford (Buckinghamshire) inclosure.|private|40|21-01-1790|note3=|repealed=n|archived=n|}}

| {{|Lutterworth (Leicestershire) inclosure.|private|41|21-01-1790|note3=|repealed=n|archived=n|}}

| {{|Clayworth (Nottinghamshire) inclosure.|private|42|21-01-1790|note3=|repealed=n|archived=n|}}

| {{|Whychurch, Milborne and Little Somerford (Wiltshire) inclosure and drainage.|private|43|21-01-1790|note3=|repealed=n|archived=n|}}

| {{|Tickton Carr (Yorkshire, East Riding) inclosure.|private|44|21-01-1790|note3=|repealed=n|archived=n|}}

| {{|Great and Little Bedwin and Preshute (Wiltshire) division and allotment of open and common lands.|private|45|21-01-1790|note3=|repealed=n|archived=n|}}

| {{|Hutton Bushell (Yorkshire, North Riding) inclosure.|private|46|21-01-1790|note3=|repealed=n|archived=n|}}

| {{|Naturalization of Françoise De Luc.|private|47|21-01-1790|note3=|repealed=n|archived=n|}}

| {{|Naturalization of August Schonberg.|private|48|21-01-1790|note3=|repealed=n|archived=n|}}

| {{|Sir Peter Burrell's and Reverend Edward Brackenbury's estates: partition.|private|49|21-01-1790|note3=|repealed=n|archived=n|}}
}}

1791 (31 Geo. 3)

The first session of the 17th Parliament of Great Britain, which sat between 10 August 1790 and 16 August 1791.

See:

Public acts

| {{|Malt Duties Act 1791|public|2|29-12-1790|repealed=y|archived=n|An Act for granting to His Majesty additional Duties on the Amount of the Duties under the Management of the Commissioners for the Affairs of Taxes therein mentioned.}}

| {{|Time for Entering into Recognisances Act 1791|public|3|29-12-1790|repealed=y|archived=n|An Act to give further Time to John Macbride Esquire, and his Sureties, for entering into their Recognizances in respect of his Petition presented to the House of Commons, complaining of an undue Election and Return for the Borough of Plymouth, in the County of Devon.}}

| {{|Importation and Exportation Act 1791|public|4|29-12-1790|repealed=y|archived=n|An Act to continue and amend so much of two Acts made in the last Session of Parliament, as relates to the Importation and Exportation of Corn and Grain, and to the authorising His Majesty to permit the Exportation of Corn, Grain, Meal, or Flour, and to prohibit the Importation thereof on the low Duties.}}

| {{|Assessed Taxes Act 1791|public|5|29-12-1790|repealed=y|archived=n|An Act for granting to His Majesty additional Duties on the Amount of the Duties under the Management of the Commissioners for the Affairs of Taxes therein mentioned.}}

| {{|Land Tax Act 1791|public|6|29-12-1790|repealed=y|archived=n|An Act for granting an Aid to His Majesty, by a Land Tax to be raised in Great Britain for the Service of the Year One thousand seven hundred and ninety-one.}}

| {{|Malt Duties (No. 2) Act 1791|public|7|29-12-1790|repealed=y|archived=n|An Act for continuing and granting to His Majesty certain Duties upon Malt, Mum, Cyder, and Perry, for the Service of the Year One thousand seven hundred and ninety-one.}}

| {{|Indemnity Act 1791|public|8|23-03-1791|repealed=y|archived=n|An Act to indemnify such Persons as have omitted to qualify themselves for Offices and Employments, and to indemnify Justices of the Peace, or others, who have omitted to register or deliver in their Qualifications within the Time limited by Law, and for giving further Time for those Purposes; and to indemnify Members and Officers in Cities, Corporations, and Borough Towns, whose Admissions have been omitted to be stamped according to Law, or having been stamped, have been lost, or mislaid, and for allowing them Time to provide Admissions duly stamped; to give further Time to such Persons as have omitted to make and file Affidavits of the Execution of Indentures, of Clerks to Attornies and Solicitors; and for indemnifying Deputy Lieutenants and Officers of the Militia who have neglected to transmit Descriptions of their Qualifications to the Clerks of the Peace within the Time limited by Law, and for giving further Time for that Purpose.}}

| {{|Marine Mutiny Act 1791|public|9|23-03-1791|repealed=y|archived=n|An Act for the Regulation of His Majesty's Marine Forces while on Shore.}}

| {{|Expenses of Her Majesty's Forces, India Act 1791|public|10|23-03-1791|repealed=y|archived=n|An Act for altering and amending so much of an Act passed in the Twenty-eighth Year of His Majesty's Reign, intituled, "An Act for removing any Doubt respecting the Power of the Commissioners for the Affairs of India, to direct that the Expence of raising, transporting, and maintaining such Troops as may be judged necessary for the Security of the British Territories and Possessions in the East Indies, should be defrayed out of the Revenues arising from the said Territories and Possessions, and for limiting the Application of the said Revenues in the Manner therein mentioned;" as relates to such Directions as shall be given or approved by the said Commissioners, with respect to the Payment of certain Proportions of His Majesty's Forces in India, and of the Europèan Forces of the East India Company therein specified.}}

| {{|East India Company (Money) Act 1791|note1=(also known as the East India Company (Stock) Act 1791)|public|11|23-03-1791|repealed=y|archived=n|An Act for removing any Doubt respecting the Sale or Mortgage of Annuities, pursuant to an Act made in the Twenty-sixth Year of the Reign of His present Majesty, intituled, "An Act to enable the East India Company to raise Money by a Sale of Annuities, and by increasing their Capital Stock."}}

| {{|Trade with America Act 1791|public|12|23-03-1791|repealed=y|archived=n|An Act to continue the Laws now in Force, for regulating the Trade between the Subjects of His Majesty's Dominions and the Inhabitants of the Territories belonging to the United States of America, so far as the same relate to the Trade and Commerce carried on between this Kingdom and the Inhabitants of the Countries belonging to the said United States.}}

| {{|Mutiny Act 1791|public|13|23-03-1791|repealed=y|archived=n|An Act for punishing Mutiny and Desertion, and for the better Payment of the Army and their Quarters.}}

| {{|Land Tax (Commissioners) Act 1791|public|14|23-03-1791|repealed=y|archived=n|An Act for appointing Commissioners for putting in Execution an Act of this Session of Parliament, intituled, "An Act for granting an Aid to His Majesty by a Land Tax, to be raised in Great Britain, for the Service of the Year One thousand seven hundred and ninety-one."}}

| {{|Customs Act 1791|public|15|25-11-1790|note3=|repealed=y|archived=n|An Act for granting to His Majesty an additional Duty on Sugar imported into this Kingdom.}}

| {{|Militia Pay Act 1791|public|16|11-04-1791|repealed=y|archived=n|An Act for defraying the Charge of Pay and cloathing of the Militia, in that Part of Great Britain called England, for one Year, beginning the Twentyfifth Day of March, One thousand seven hundred and ninety-one.}}

| {{|Deritend and Bordesley, Warwick: Improvement Act 1791|public|17|11-04-1791|repealed=y|archived=n|An Act for cleansing, lighting, watching, and levelling the Surfaces of the Streets, and other public Places, within the Hamlets of Deretend and Bordesley in the County of Warwick, and for removing, and preventing Nuisances, Obstructions, and Encroachments, and regulating the driving of Carts and other Carriages, used for carrying Goods, Wares, and Merchandize therein.}}

| {{|Saint Pancras: Improvement Act 1791|public|18|11-04-1791|repealed=y|archived=n|An Act to explain and amend an Act made in the Twelsth Year of the Reign of His present Majesty, intituled, "An Act for paving, lighting, cleansing, watering, and watching the Streets and other Public Places within such Part of the Parish of Saint Pancras, in the County of Middlesex, as lies on the West Side of Tottenham Court Road, and for preventing Nuisances and Obstructions therein, and for obliging the Trustees, for the Care of the said Road, to pave, repair, and cleanse such Part of the said Road as is therein described.}}

| {{|Bermondsey: Poor Relief Act 1791|public|19|11-04-1791|repealed=y|archived=n|An Act for amending and enlarging the Powers of, and rendering more effectual an Act made in the Thirty-first Year of the Reign of His late Majesty King George the Second, intituled, "An Act for ascertaining and collecting the Poors Rates, and for better regulating the Poor, in the Parish of Saint Mary Magdalen, Bermondsey, in the County of Surrey; and for other the Purposes therein mentioned.}}

| {{|Cottingham, Yorkshire: Inclosure Act 1791|public|20|11-04-1791|repealed=y|archived=n|An Act for dividing and enclosing certain Open Fields, Lands, and Grounds in the Parish of Cottingham, in the East Riding of the County of York, and for amending an Act passed in the Sixth Year of the Reign of His present Majesty, for dividing, enclosing, and draining certain Lands, Grounds, and Common Pastures, in the said Parish.}}

| {{|Certificates for Killing Hares Act 1791|public|21|06-06-1791|repealed=y|archived=n|An Act for granting to His Majesty an additional Duty on Certificates, issued with respect to the killing of Game:}}

| {{|Surrey Gaol Act 1791|public|22|13-05-1791|repealed=y|archived=n|An Act for building a new Common Gaol and Session House, with Accommodations thereto, for the County of Surrey, and for disposing of the present County Gaol and the Ground thereto belonging.}}

| {{|Maryport Harbour Act 1791|public|23|11-04-1791|repealed=y|archived=n|An Act for enlarging the Term and Powers of two Acts, made one in the Twenty-second, and the other in the Twenty-ninth Year of the Reign of King George the Second, for repairing, enlarging, and preserving the Harbour of Mary Port, in the County of Cumberland.}}

| {{|Oswestry: Poor Relief Act 1791|public|24|11-04-1791|repealed=y|archived=n|An Act for the better Relief and Employment of the Poor belonging to the Town of Oswestry, and to certain Parishes within the Hundred of Oswestry, in the County of Salop, and to such Part of the Parish of Llanymynech as lies within the said Hundred, and to the Parish of Chirk, in the County of Denbigh, and to the Parish of Llansilin, in the Counties of Salop and Denbigh.}}

| {{|Stamps Act 1791|public|25|06-06-1791|repealed=y|archived=n|An Act for repealing the Duties now charged on Bills of Exchange, Promissory Notes, and other Notes, Drafts, and Orders, and on Receipts; and for granting other Duties in lieu thereof.}}

| {{|Customs Act 1791|public|26|06-06-1791|repealed=y|archived=n|An Act to allow the Importation of Seal Skins cured with Foreign Salt free of Duty for a limited Time.}}

| {{|Repeal of Certain Excise Duties Act 1791|public|27|06-06-1791|repealed=y|archived=n|An Act for repealing certain Duties of Excise upon tanned Goat Skins and Sheep Skins, and for granting other Duties in lieu thereof; and also certain Duties of Customs on tanned Goat Skins imported.}}

| {{|Officers of Late Wine Licences Office Act 1791|public|28|06-06-1791|repealed=y|archived=n|An Act to enable His Majesty to make Compensation to the Officers of the late Wine Licence Office for the Loss of their Offices.}}

| {{|Courts, Newfoundland Act 1791|public|29|06-06-1791|repealed=y|archived=n|An Act for establishing a Court of Civil Jurisdiction in the Island of Newfoundland, for a limited Time.}}

| {{|Importation and Exportation (No. 2) Act 1791|public|30|10-06-1791|repealed=y|archived=n|An Act for regulating the Importation and Exportation of Corn, and the Payment of the Duty on Foreign Corn imported, and of the Bounty on British Corn exported.}}

| {{|Clergy Endowments (Canada) Act 1791|note1= (also known as Constitutional Act 1791)|public|31|10-06-1791|repealed=y|archived=n|An Act to repeal certain Parts of an Act, passed in the fourteenth Year of his Majesty's Reign, intituled, "An Act for making more effectual Provision for the Government of the Province of Quebec, in North America;S and to make further Provision for the Government of the said Province.}}

| {{|Roman Catholic Relief Act 1791|public|32|10-06-1791|repealed=y|archived=n|An Act to relieve, upon Conditions and under Restrictions, the Persons therein described, from certain Penalties and Disabilities to which Papists, or Persons professing the Popish Religion, are by Law subject.}}

| {{|Bank of England Act 1791|public|33|10-06-1791|repealed=y|archived=n|An Act for the Payment of the Sum of Five hundred thousand Pounds, by the Governor and Company of the Bank of England, into the Receipt of His Majesty's Exchequer.}}

| {{|Annuity to Duke of Clarence Act 1791|public|34|06-06-1791|repealed=y|archived=n|An Act for enabling His Majesty to settle an Annuity of Twelve thousand Pounds on His Royal Highness the Duke of Clarence during Pleasure.}}

| {{|Evidence Act 1791|public|35|06-06-1791|repealed=y|archived=n|An Act to render Persons convicted of Petty Larceny competent Witnesses.}}

| {{|Newcastle (Sale of Coal by Measured Keel) Act 1791|public|36|06-06-1791|repealed=y|archived=n|An Act to prevent Keels, Pan Keels, and Pan Boats, and other Boats, and Wains and Carts, being used in the Removal or Carriage of Coals, after having undergone any Alterations or Repairs without being first inspected, re-admeasured, marked and nailed.}}

| {{|Importation Act 1791|public|37|06-06-1791|repealed=y|archived=n|An Act to prohibit the Importation into Great Britain of Silk Crapes and Tiffanies of the Manufacture of Italy, unless brought directly from thence.}}

| {{|Importation (No. 2) Act 1791|public|38|06-06-1791|repealed=y|archived=n|An Act to amend an Act made in the Twentyeighth Year of His present Majesty's Reign for regulating the Trade between the Subjects of His Majesty's Colonies and Plantations in North America and in the West India Islands, and the Countries belonging to the United States of America, and between His Majesty's said Subjects and the Foreign Islands in the West Indies; and also an Act made in the Twentyseventh Year of His present Majesty's Reign, for allowing the Importation and Exportation of certain Goods, Wares, and Merchandize in the Ports of Kingston, Savannah-la-Mar, Montego Bay, and Santa Lucea in the Island of Jamaica, in the Port of Saint George in the Island of Grenada, in the Port of Rosea in the Island of Dominica, and in the Port of Nassau in the Island of New Providence, one of the Bahama Islands, under certain Regulations and Restrictions.}}

| {{|Merchant Shipping Act 1791|public|39|06-06-1791|repealed=y|archived=n|An Act for the better Regulation and Government of Seamen employed in the Coasting Trade of this Kingdom.}}

| {{|East Indies Act 1791|public|40|06-06-1791|repealed=y|archived=n|An Act for establishing and confirming a certain Resolution or Order of the Governor-General in Council of Fort William in Bengal, and all Acts done by virtue thereof, and for granting further Powers to the said Governor-General during his Residence on the Coasts of Coromandel and Malabar.}}

| {{|Appropriation Act 1791|public|41|06-06-1791|repealed=y|archived=n|An Act for granting to His Majesty certain Sums of Money out of the Consolidated Fund for applying certain Monies therein mentioned for the Service of the Year One thousand seven hundred and ninety-one, and for further appropriating the Supplies granted in this Session of Parliament.}}

| {{|Duties on Importation, etc. Act 1791|public|42|06-06-1791|repealed=y|archived=n|An Act for indemnifying all Persons who have been concerned in advising or carrying into Execution a certain Order of Council respecting the Importation of a limited Quantity of Salt-petre, for repealing the Duties now payable upon the Importation of Saltpetre, and for granting other Duties in lieu thereof.}}

| {{|Continuance of Laws, etc. Act 1791|public|43|06-06-1791|repealed=y|archived=n|An Act to continue several Laws relating to the granting a Bounty on certain Species of British and Irish Linens exported, and taking off the Duties on the Importation of Foreign Raw Linen Yarns made of Flax; to the importing Salt from Europe into the Province of Quebec in America; to the allowing a Bounty on the Exportation of British-made Cordage; to continue and amend several Laws relating to the Encouragement of the Fisheries carried on in the Greenland Seas and Davis's Streights; and to the prohibiting the Exportation of Tools and Utensils made use of in the Iron and Steel Manufactures of this Kingdom; and to prevent the seducing of Artificers and Workmen employed in those Manufactures to go into Parts beyond the Seas; and to make perpetual an Act made in the Fifteenth Year of the Reign of His present Majesty, to permit the free Importation of Raw Goat Skins into this Kingdom.}}

| {{|Ascertaining of Strength of Spirits Act 1791|public|44|06-06-1791|repealed=y|archived=n|An Act to continue the several Laws therein mentioned, so far as relates to the ascertaining the Strength of Spirits by Clarke's Hydrometer.}}

| {{|Pilchard Fisheries Act 1791|public|45|06-06-1791|repealed=y|archived=n|An Act for the Encouragement of the Pilchard Fishery, by allowing a further Bounty upon Pilchards taken, cured, and exported.}}

| {{|Gaols Act 1791|public|46|10-06-1791|repealed=y|archived=n|An Act for the better regulating of Gaols and other Places of Confinement.}}

| {{|Importation and Exportation (No. 3) Act 1791|public|47|06-06-1791|repealed=y|archived=n|An Act to prevent other Ships than those laden with Tobacco from Mooring and discharging their Lading at the Places appointed by an Act made in the Twenty-ninth Year of the Reign of His present Majesty, intituled, "An Act for repealing the Duties on Tobacco and Snuff, and for granting new Duties in lieu thereof; to prohibit the Exportation of damaged or mean Tobacco; and for permitting the Importation of Tobacco and Snuff into the Port of Newcastleupon-Tyne.}}

| {{|Loans or Exchequer Bills Act 1791|public|48|06-06-1791|repealed=y|archived=n|An Act for raising a certain Sum of Money, by Loans or Exchequer Bills, for the Service of the Year One thousand seven hundred and ninety-one.}}

| {{|Loans or Exchequer Bills (No. 2) Act 1791|public|49|06-06-1791|repealed=y|archived=n|An Act for raising a certain Sum of Money, by Loans or Exchequer Bills, for defraying the Public Expences occasioned by the Augmentation of His Majesty's Forces in the Year One thousand seven hundred and ninety.}}

| {{|Loans or Exchequer Bills (No. 3) Act 1791|public|50|06-06-1791|repealed=y|archived=n|An Act for raising a further Sum of Money, by Loans or Exchequer Bills, for the Service of the Year One thousand seven hundred and ninety-one.}}

| {{|Oyster Fisheries Act 1791|public|51|10-06-1791|repealed=y|archived=n|An Act for better protecting the several Oyster Fisheries within this Kingdom.}}

| {{|Pawnbrokers Act 1791|public|52|06-06-1791|repealed=y|archived=n|An Act to continue for a limited Time, an Act passed in the Twenty-ninth Year of the Reign of His present Majesty, intituled, "An Act for further regulating the Trade or Business of Pawnbrokers."}}

| {{|Lottery Act 1791|public|53|06-06-1791|repealed=y|archived=n|An Act for granting to His Majesty a certain Sum of Money to be raised by a Lottery.}}

| {{|Slave Trade Act 1791|public|54|10-06-1791|repealed=y|archived=n|An Act to continue for a limited Time, and to amend an Act made in the last Session of Parliament, intituled, "An Act to amend and continue for a limited Time, several Acts of Parliament, for regulating the shipping and carrying Slaves in British Vessels, from the Coast of Africa.}}

| {{|Sierra Leone Company Act 1791|public|55|06-06-1791|repealed=y|archived=n|An Act for establishing a Company for carrying on Trade between the Kingdom of Great Britain and the Coasts, Harbours, and Countries of Africa, and for enabling the said Company to hold by Grant from His Majesty, His Heirs, and Successors, and from the Native Princes of Africa, a certain District of Land commonly called The Peninsula of Sierra Leone, now vested in His Majesty, or belonging to the said Princes, for the better enabling the said Company to carry on the said Trade.}}

| {{|Woollen, etc., Manufactures, Norfolk Act 1791|public|56|06-06-1791|repealed=y|archived=n|An Act more effectually to prevent Abuses and Frauds committed by Persons employed in the Manufactures of combing Wool and Worsted Yarn, in the County of Norfolk, and City of Norwich, and County of the said City.}}

| {{|Edinburgh Bridewell Act 1791|public|57|06-06-1791|repealed=y|archived=n|An Act for building and maintaining a Bridewell and Correction House in and for the City and County of Edinburgh.}}

| {{|Hallamshire Cutlers Act 1791|public|58|10-06-1791|repealed=y|archived=n|An Act for the better Regulation and Government of the Company of Cutlers, within the Liberty of Hallamshire, in the County of York, and within Six Miles of the said Liberty, and of their Journeymen and Apprentices.}}

| {{|Worcester and Birmingham Canal Act 1791|public|59|10-06-1791|repealed=y|archived=n|An Act for making and maintaining a Navigable Canal from or from near to the Town of Birmingham, in the County of Warwick, to communicate with the River Severn, near to the City of Worcester.}}

| {{|Selby Bridge Act 1791|public|60|11-04-1791|repealed=y|archived=n|An Act for building a Bridge near the Ferry over the River Ouze, from Selby, in the West Riding of the County of York, to the opposite Shore in the Parish of Hemingborough, in the East Riding of the said County.}}

| {{|Christchurch, Surrey: Improvement Act 1791|public|61|06-06-1791|repealed=y|archived=n|An Act for paving, cleansing, lighting, watching, widening, regulating, and improving a certain Street called the Upper Ground Street, in the Parish of Christ Church, in the County of Surrey, and certain other Streets, Lanes, Passages, and Places within the said Parish, and for removing and preventing Encroachments, Nuisances, and Annoyances therein, and for shutting up Part of an Alley or Passage leading from Bull Alley to Marygold Court.}}

| {{|Maidstone, Kent: Improvement Act 1791|public|62|06-06-1791|repealed=y|archived=n|An Act for widening, improving, regulating, paving, cleansing, and lighting the Streets, Lanes, and other Public Passages and Places, within the King's Town of Maidstone, in the County of Kent, for removing and preventing Encroachments, Obstructions, Nuisances, and Annoyances therein, for better supplying the said Town with Water, and for repairing the Highways within the Parish of Maidstone.}}

| {{|Chichester Paving and Improvement Act 1791|public|63|06-06-1791|repealed=y|archived=n|An Act for repealing an Act made in the Eighteenth Year of the Reign of Queen Elizabeth, intituled, "An Act for paving of the City of Chichester," and for the better paving, repairing, and cleansing the Streets, Lanes, and Public Ways and Passages, within the Walls of the said City; and for removing and preventing Encroachments, Obstructions, and Annoyances therein.}}

| {{|Deal: Improvement Act 1791|public|64|13-05-1791|repealed=y|archived=n|An Act for repairing, paving, and cleansing the Highways, Streets and Lanes, within the Town and Borough of Deal, in the County of Kent, and for removing and preventing Encroachments, Obstructions, Nuisances, and Annoyances therein.}}

| {{|Leicester Navigation Act 1791|note1=|public|65|13-05-1791|repealed=y|archived=n|An Act for making and maintaining a Navigable Communication between the Loughborough Canal and the Town of Leicester, and for making and maintaining a Communication by Railways or Stone Roads, and Water Levels, from several Places and Mines to the said Loughborough Canal, and for continuing the same, by passing along the said Canal to the said Navigable Communication, all in the County of Leicester.}}

| {{|River Rother Navigation Act 1791|public|66|11-04-1791|repealed=y|archived=n|An Act to enable the Earl of Egremont to make, and maintain the River Rother Navigable from the Town of Midhurst, to a certain Meadow called the Railed Pieces or Stopham Meadow, in the Parish of Stopham, and a Navigable Cut from the said River to the River Arun, at or near Stopham Bridge, in the County of Sussex, and for other Purposes.}}

| {{|Thames and Severn Canal Act 1791|public|67|13-05-1791|repealed=y|archived=n|An Act to enable the Company of Proprietors of the Thames and Severn Canal Navigation to borrow a further Sum of Money, to complete the said Navigation.}}

| {{|Manchester, Bolton and Bury Canal Act 1791|public|68|13-05-1791|repealed=y|archived=n|An Act for making and maintaining a Navigable Canal from Manchester to or near Presto-lee Bridge, in the Township of Little Lever, and from thence by one Branch to or near the Town of Bolton, and by another Branch to or near the Town of Bury, and to Weddell Brook, in the Parish of Bury, all in the County Palatine of Lancaster.}}

| {{|Leominster Canal Act 1791|public|69|13-05-1791|repealed=y|archived=n|An Act for making and maintaining a Navigable Canal from Kington, in the County of Hereford, by or through Leominster, to join the River Severn near Stourport Bridge, in the County of Worcester.}}

| {{|Stourbridge: Improvement Act 1791|public|70|13-05-1791|repealed=y|archived=n|An Act for lighting, cleansing, and watching the Streets, Lanes, and other public Passages and Places, within the Township of Stourbridge, in the Parish of Old Swinford, in the County of Worcester, and for removing and preventing Obstructions, Nuisances, and Annoyances therein.}}

| {{|All Saints Church, Southampton Act 1791|public|71|13-05-1791|repealed=y|archived=n|An Act for taking down and re-building the Parish Church of All Saints, within the Town and County of the Town of Southampton, and for purchasing Land for the Purpose of a Church Yard for the Use of the said Parish.}}

| {{|Loes and Wilford, Suffolk: Poor Relief Act 1791|public|72|13-05-1791|repealed=y|archived=n|An Act for the better Relief and Employment of the Poor within the Hundreds of Loes and Wilford, in the County of Suffolk.}}

| {{|Saffron Walden Parish Church Act 1791|public|73|06-06-1791|repealed=y|archived=n|An Act for repairing the Parish Church of Saffron Walden, in the County of Essex.}}

| {{|Wakefield Church Act 1791|public|74|06-06-1791|repealed=y|archived=n|An Act for building a new Church in the Town of Wakefield, in the West Riding of the County of York, and for providing a proper Burial Ground, and making Provision for a Minister to officiate in the said Church.}}

| {{|Saint Chad, Shrewsbury Church Act 1791|public|75|06-06-1791|repealed=y|archived=n|An Act for enlarging the Powers of an Act passed in the Twenty-ninth Year of the Reign of His present Majesty, intituled, "An Act for rebuilding the Parish Church of Saint Chad, in the Town of Shrewsbury and County of Salop, and for providing a new Cemetery or Burial Ground, and making convenient Avenues and Passages to the said Church and Cemetery; and for raising a further Sum of Money for fully effecting the general Purposes in the said Act mentioned."}}

| {{|Lower Ouse: Navigation Act 1791|public|76|06-06-1791|repealed=y|archived=n|An Act for improving the Navigation of the River Ouse, between Newhaven Bridge and Lewes Bridge, in the County of Sussex, and for the better draining of the Low Lands lying in Lewes and Laughton Levels, in the said County.}}

| {{|Wreak and Eye: Navigation Act 1791|public|77|06-06-1791|repealed=y|archived=n|An Act for making navigable the Rivers Wreak and Eye, from the Junction of the said River Wreak, with the intended Navigation from Loughborough to Leicester, at or near a certain Place called Turnwater Meadow, in the Lordship of Cossington, to Mill Close Homestead, in the Parish of Melton Mowbray, all in the County of Leicester.}}

| {{|Ellesmere, Salop: Poor Relief Act 1791|public|78|06-06-1791|repealed=y|archived=n|An Act for the better Relief and Employment of the Poor belonging to the several Parishes of Ellesmere, Middle, Baschurch, and Hordley, and to the Chapelry or District of Hadnal (otherwise Hadnal Ease), in the County of Salop.}}

| {{|Dudley: Improvement Act 1791|public|79|06-06-1791|repealed=y|archived=n|An Act for better paving, cleansing, lighting, watching, and otherwise improving the Town of Dudley, in the County of Worcester, and for better supplying the said Town with Water.}}

| {{|Lincoln: Improvement Act 1791|public|80|06-06-1791|repealed=y|archived=n|An Act for paving the Footways of certain Streets within the City of Lincoln, for cleansing, lighting, and watching the said Streets, and other Streets, Lanes, and Public Passages and Places within the said City, and for removing and preventing Nuisances, Annoyances, and Encroachments therein.}}

| {{|Isle of Ely: Drainage Act 1791|public|81|06-06-1791|repealed=y|archived=n|An Act for embanking and draining certain Fen Lands and Low Grounds within the Parishes of Chatteris and Dodington and Hamlet of Wimblington, in the said Parish of Dodington, in the Isle of Ely, and County of Cambridge, and for dividing, allotting, and enclosing the Commons and Waste Lands within the said Hamlet of Wimblington.}}

| {{|Kirkcaldy Beer Duties Act 1791|public|82|06-06-1791|repealed=y|archived=n|An Act to continue two Acts made in the Fifteenth and Thirty-first Years of the Reign of His late Majesty King George the Second, for laying a Duty of Two Pennies Scots, or One-sixth Part of a Penny Sterling, upon every Scots Pint of Ale and Beer which shall be brewed for Sale, brought into, tapped, or sold, within the Town of Kirkcaldy and Liberties thereof.}}

| {{|Swansea Harbour Act 1791|public|83|06-06-1791|repealed=y|archived=n|An Act for repairing, enlarging, and preserving the Harbour of Swansea, in the County of Glamorgan.}}

| {{|Staines Bridge Act 1791|public|84|06-06-1791|repealed=y|archived=n|An Act for building a Bridge cross the River Thames from Stanes to Egham, in the Counties of Middlesex and Surrey.}}

| {{|Neath Canal Act 1791|public|85|06-06-1791|repealed=y|archived=n|An Act for making and maintaining a Canal or Navigable Communication from or near a certain Place called Abernant, in the County of Glamorgan, to and through a certain Place called the Brickfield, near Melincrythan Pill, into the River of Neath, near the Town of Neath, in the said County.}}

| {{|Lewes: Improvement Act 1791|public|86|06-06-1791|repealed=y|archived=n|An Act for enlarging and extending the Powers of the present Prescriptive Market within the Town and Borough of Lewes, in the County of Sussex, and removing the same to a more convenient Place within the said Town and Borough, or within the Precinct of the Castle of Lewes aforesaid.}}

| {{|Sunderland: Poor Relief Act 1791|public|87|06-06-1791|repealed=y|archived=n|An Act for the better Maintenance and Support of the Poor of the Parish of Sunderland, near the Sea, in the County Palatine of Durham.}}

| {{|River Dee: Navigation Act 1791|public|88|10-06-1791|repealed=y|archived=n|An Act for confirming an Agreement entered into between the Company of Proprietors of the Undertaking for recovering and preserving the Navigation of the River Dee, and certain Lords of Manors, and other Persons entitled to Right of Common upon the Wastes and Commons, and the Old Common Salt Marshes, lying on the South Side of the said River, below, or to the North-east of Greenfield Gate, in the County of Flint, and an Award made in Consequence thereof.}}

| {{|Herefordshire and Gloucestershire Canal Act 1791|public|89|11-04-1791|repealed=y|archived=n|An Act for making and maintaining a Navigable Cut or Canal from the City of Hereford to the City of Gloucester, with a Collateral Cut from the same to the Town of Newent in the County of Gloucester.}}

| {{|Finsbury Square Act 1791|public|90|10-06-1791|repealed=y|archived=n|An Act for paving, lighting, watching, cleansing, watering, repairing, and keeping in Repair Finsbury Square, in the Parish of Saint Luke, in the County of Middlesex, and Part of the Manor of Finsbury, and certain other Streets and Places communicating with, or near to the said Square, and for preventing or removing Nuisances and Annoyances within the same.}}

| {{|Sedgmoor: Drainage Act 1791|public|91|13-05-1791|repealed=y|archived=n|An Act for draining and dividing a certain Moor, or Tract of Waste Land, called King's Sedgmoor, in the County of Somerset.}}

| {{|Holy Island: Inclosure Act 1791|public|92|06-06-1791|repealed=y|archived=n|An Act for dividing, allotting, and enclosing a certain large Open Tract of Land, within the Manor of Holy Island, in the County Palatine of Durham, and for extinguishing the Right of Common upon the ancient Infield Lands within the said Island,}}

| {{|Anwick: Inclosure Act 1791|public|93|06-06-1791|repealed=y|archived=n|An Act for dividing and enclosing the Open Common Fields, Meadow Ground, Half-Year's Land, Common Fens, and Waste Lands, within the Parish of Anwick, in the County of Lincoln, and for embanking and draining the said Common Fens, and certain enclosed Low Lands adjoining thereto, called the Praie Grounds, in or near the Township of North Kyme, in the said County.}}

| {{|Kent Roads Act 1791|public|94|29-12-1790|repealed=y|archived=n|An Act for making a new Road from Saint George's Gate, in the City of Canterbury, to a Place called Gutteridge Bottom; and for repairing and widening the present Road from thence to the Dover Turnpike Road in the Parish of Barham, in the County of Kent.}}

| {{|Ayr Roads Act 1791|public|95|23-03-1791|repealed=y|archived=n|An Act for amending an Act made in the Twenty-ninth Year of the Reign of His present Majesty, for making and repairing the Road from the City of Glasgow, in the County of Lanark, to Muirkirk, in the County of Ayr, and from thence to the Consines of the said County of Ayr towards Sanquhar, in the County of Dumfries, and other Roads communicating therewith; and for the more effectually repairing the said Roads, and the Road from the Village of Gorbals and new Bridge of Glasgow to the Chapel of Cambuslang, in the said County of Lanark, and Branches thereof; and for making and repairing the Road from the said Chapel of Cambuslang till it joins the High Road leading from Hamilton by Burnbank towards Eaglesham in the County of Renfrew.}}

| {{|Bedford and Huntingdonshire Roads Act 1791|public|96|23-03-1791|repealed=y|archived=n|An Act for enlarging the Term and Powers of Two Acts of the Tenth Year of His present Majesty, and the last Session of Parliament, for repairing the Road from Biggleswade, in the County of Bedford, through Bugden and Alconbury to the Top of Alconbury Hill, and from Bugden to Huntingdon, and from Cross Hall to Great Stoughton Common, in the County of Huntingdon; and also the Road leading out of the aforesaid Road at or near the Ferry House in the Parish of Tempsford, to and through Little Barford, Eynesbury, and Saint Neot's to the Turnpike Road at the End of Cross Hall Lane, and from the Turnpike Road in the Parish of Eaton Soken, to the said Turnpike Road near Saint Neot's Bridge.}}

| {{|Cardigan Roads Act 1791|public|97|23-03-1791|repealed=y|archived=n|An Act for continuing the Term and altering and enlarging the Powers of an Act made in the Tenth Year of His Majesty's Reign for repairing several Roads in the County of Cardigan, and for repairing other Roads in the said County.}}

| {{|Warwick Roads Act 1791|public|98|23-03-1791|repealed=y|archived=n|An Act to enlarge the Term of an Act passed in the Tenth Year of the Reign of His present Majesty, for amending the Road from Wellsbourn Mountfort to Stratford-upon-Avon, in the County of Warwick.}}

| {{|Essex and Hertfordshire Roads Act 1791|public|99|23-03-1791|repealed=y|archived=n|An Act for enlarging the Term and Powers of Two Acts of the Seventeenth Year of His late Majesty, and the Ninth Year of His present Majesty, for repairing and widening the Road leading from a Place called Harlow Bush Common, in the Parish of Harlow, in the County of Essex, to Stump Cross in the Parish of Great Chesterford, in the said County.}}

| {{|Norfolk Roads Act 1791|public|100|11-04-1791|repealed=y|archived=n|An Act for enlarging the Term and Powers of an Act of the Tenth Year of His present Majesty, for amending and widening several Roads leading from the Bell in Stoke Ferry, in the County of Norfolk; and for amending, widening, and keeping in Repair, the Road from Methwold Warren House to a Place called the Devil's Ditch in the said County.}}

| {{|Bicester to Aylesbury Road Act 1791|public|101|11-04-1791|repealed=y|archived=n|An Act to enlarge the Term and Powers of an Act passed in the Tenth Year of the Reign of His present Majesty, for repairing and widening the Road from Bicester in the County of Oxford, to Aylesbury in the County of Bucks.}}

| {{|Pembroke Roads Act 1791|public|102|11-04-1791|repealed=y|archived=n|An Act for amending, widening, and keeping in Repair, the Road leading from Robeston Wathan to Saint Clears, and other Roads therein mentioned, in the Counties of Pembroke and Carmarthen.}}

| {{|Bicester to Aynho Road Act 1791|public|103|11-04-1791|repealed=y|archived=n|An Act for repairing and widening the Road from the Market Place in Bicester in the County of Oxford, to the Buckingham Turnpike Road in Aynho in the County of Northampton.}}

| {{|Sussex Roads Act 1791|public|104|13-05-1791|repealed=y|archived=n|An Act for opening a new Road from Milford, in the County of Pembroke, to Stainton, and for amending and widening the Road from the said new Road through Stainton and Johnson to Merlin's Bridge, in the same County.}}

| {{|Berkshire Roads Act 1791|public|105|25-11-1790|note3=|repealed=y|archived=n|}}

| {{|Fishguard Roads Act 1791|public|106|11-04-1791|repealed=y|archived=n|An Act for amending, widening, and keeping in Repair, the Road leading from the Town of Haverfordwest, through the Town of Fishguard to the Town of Newport, in the County of Pembroke, and also from the Town of Fishguard to the City of Saint David's in the said County of Pembroke.}}

| {{|Ayr Roads Act 1791|public|107|10-06-1791|repealed=y|archived=n|An Act to enlarge the Term and Powers of several Acts, made for repairing the Roads from Livingstone, by the Kirk of Shotts, to the City of Glasgow, and by the Town of Hamilton, to the Town of Strathaven, and for repairing and widening the Roads from the Confines of the County of Ayr, at or near Lochgate, to the Town of Strathaven, and for repairing the several Roads leading into the City of Glasgow; so far as the same relate to the Road leading from the Town of Airdrie towards the City of Glasgow, through the Village of Shettleston, till it falls into the Great Road from Murriehall to the said City, and for repairing the Road from the said Great Road, by Drygate and Whitehill, to Carntyne, and for repairing and widening several other Roads; and for building a Bridge over the River Clyde, at or near Theevesfoord; and for opening and making certain Streets in and near the City of Glasgow.}}

| {{|Hertford and Middlesex Roads Act 1791|public|108|25-11-1790|note3=|repealed=y|archived=n|}}

| {{|Pembroke Roads (No. 2) Act 1791|public|109|13-05-1791|repealed=y|archived=n|An Act for opening a new Road from Milford, in the County of Pembroke, to Stainton, and for amending and widening the Road from the said new Road through Stainton and Johnson to Merlin's Bridge, in the same County.}}

| {{|Southwark Roads Act 1791|public|110|11-04-1791|repealed=y|archived=n|An Act for enlarging the Term, and for explaining, amending, and making more effectual, the Powers of Two several Acts passed in the Twenty-second Year of the Reign of His late Majesty King George the Second, and the Seventh Year of His present Majesty, for making a new Road from New Street in the Parish of Saint John Southwark, to and through the several Places therein mentioned; and for keeping the same and several other Roads adjoining in Repair.}}

| {{|Oxford and Gloucester Roads Act 1791|public|111|11-04-1791|repealed=y|archived=n|An Act for enlarging the Term and Powers of an Act of the Fifth Year of His present Majesty, for repairing the Road leading from Chapel-on-the-Heath, in the County of Oxford, to Bourton-on-the-Hill, in the County of Gloucester.}}

| {{|Norfolk Roads (No. 2) Act 1791|public|112|11-04-1791|repealed=y|archived=n|An Act for continuing and amending an Act of the Tenth Year of His present Majesty, for repairing and widening the several Roads from the South Gate, in the Borough of King's Lynn, into the Parishes of East Walton, Narborough, Stoke Ferry, and Downham, in the County of Norfolk.}}

| {{|Norfolk Roads Act 1791|public|113|11-04-1791|repealed=y|archived=n|An Act for continuing an Act of the Tenth Year of His present Majesty, for repairing and widening the Roads from the East Gate, in the Borough of King's Lynn, into the Parishes of Geyton and Grimstone, and to the Gate next Hillington on Congham Common, and to the North End of Babingley Lane, in the County of Norfolk.}}

| {{|Hereford Roads Act 1791|public|114|11-04-1791|repealed=y|archived=n|An Act for enlarging the Term and varying the Powers of an Act of the Thirteenth Year of His present Majesty, for repairing and widening certain Roads leading into the Town of Ross in the County of Hereford, and for amending, widening, and keeping in Repair certain Streets or Highways within the said Town, and also certain small Pieces of Road communicating with the Roads comprised in the said Act.}}

| {{|Lewes to Brighton Road Act 1791|public|115|25-11-1790|note3=|repealed=y|archived=n|}}

| {{|Warwick and Gloucester Roads Act 1791|public|116|25-11-1790|note3=|repealed=y|archived=n|}}

| {{|Devon Roads Act 1791|public|117|25-11-1790|note3=|repealed=y|archived=n|}}

| {{|Sussex Roads (No. 2) Act 1791|public|118|25-11-1790|note3=|repealed=y|archived=n|}}

| {{|Southampton and Berkshire Roads Act 1791|public|119|25-11-1790|note3=|repealed=y|archived=n|}}

| {{|Shepton Mallet Roads Act 1791|public|120|25-11-1790|note3=|repealed=y|archived=n|}}

| {{|Wiltshire Roads Act 1791|public|121|25-11-1790|note3=|repealed=y|archived=n|}}

| {{|Yorkshire and Westmorland Roads Act 1791|public|122|25-11-1790|note3=|repealed=y|archived=n|}}

| {{|Stafford Roads Act 1791|public|123|25-11-1790|note3=|repealed=y|archived=n|}}

| {{|Brentford Road Act 1791|public|124|25-11-1790|note3=|repealed=y|archived=n|}}

| {{|Chester Roads Act 1791|public|125|25-11-1790|note3=|repealed=y|archived=n|}}

| {{|Pembroke Roads (No. 3) Act 1791|public|126|11-04-1791|note3=|repealed=y|archived=n|An Act for amending, widening, and keeping in Repair the Roads leading from the Town of Haverfordwest to the City of Saint David's, and from the said City to Caersai, in the Parish of Saint David's in the County of Pembroke.}}

| {{|Stafford Roads (No. 2) Act 1791|public|127|11-04-1791|repealed=y|archived=n|An Act for continuing the Term, and altering and enlarging the Powers of an Act passed in the Tenth Year of the Reign of His present Majesty for repairing, widening, turning, and altering the Roads from Butterton Moor End near Oncott, in the County of Stafford, to the Three Mile Stone in the Turnpike Road leading from Buxton to Ashborne in the County of Derby, and from Blackton Moor in the County of Stafford, to the Turnpike Road leading from Buxton to Ashborne near Newhaven in the County of Derby, and from Warslow to Ecton Mine in the County of Stafford.}}

| {{|Oxford and Northampton Roads Act 1791|public|128|11-04-1791|repealed=y|archived=n|An Act for enlarging the Term of an Act of the Tenth Year of His present Majesty for repairing and widening the Road from Burford to Banbury, in the County of Oxford, and from Burford aforesaid to the Turnpike Road leading to Stow, in the County of Gloucester, at the Bottom of Stow Hill, and from Swerford Gate, in the said County of Oxford, to the Turnpike Road in Aynho, in the County of Northampton.}}

| {{|Stafford Roads (No. 3) Act 1791|public|129|06-06-1791|repealed=y|archived=n|An Act to enlarge the Term and Powers of an Act passed in the Nineteenth Year of the Reign of His present Majesty, intituled, "An Act for reducing into One Act of Parliament the several Laws now in Force for repairing the Road leading from the Town or Village of Tittensor to the most Northern Part of Talk-on-the-Hill, in Butt Lane, in the County of Stafford, and for repairing the Road from Darlastone Bridge, over Tittensor Heath, through the Town or Village of Tittensor aforesaid; and for making and keeping in Repair a Road branching out of the said Turnpike Road near the House known by the Sign of The Black Lion, to or nearly to Shelton Wharf, all in the Parish of Stoke-upon-Trent, in the said County of Stafford."}}

| {{|Hereford Roads Act 1791|public|130|25-11-1790|note3=|repealed=y|archived=n|}}

| {{|Nottingham Roads Act 1791|public|131|25-11-1790|note3=|repealed=y|archived=n|}}

| {{|Nottingham Roads (No. 2) Act 1791|public|132|25-11-1790|note3=|repealed=y|archived=n|}}

| {{|Buckingham to Banbury Road Act 1791|public|133|25-11-1790|note3=|repealed=y|archived=n|}}

| {{|Middlesex and Surrey Roads Act 1791|public|134|25-11-1790|note3=|repealed=y|archived=n|}}

| {{|Great Marlow to Stokenchurch Road Act 1791|public|135|25-11-1790|note3=|repealed=y|archived=n|}}

| {{|Buckinghamshire and Oxford Roads Act 1791|public|136|25-11-1790|note3=|repealed=y|archived=n|}}

| {{|Sussex Roads (No. 3) Act 1791|public|137|10-06-1791|repealed=y|archived=n|An Act for continuing and amending certain Acts of the Second and Twenty-second Years of His present Majesty, for repairing and widening the Road from Flimwell Vent, in the County of Sussex, through Highgate in the County of Kent, and the Parishes of Sandhurst, Newenden, and Northiam to Rye, in the said County of Sussex, and from Highgate aforesaid to Cooper's Corner, in the said County of Sussex, and for repairing and widening a Piece of Road communicating with one of the Roads comprized in the said Acts, called Whitebread Lane.}}

}}

Private and personal acts

| {{|Doveridge or Dovebridge (Derbyshire) Inclosure Act 1791|private|2|29-12-1790|repealed=n|archived=n|An Act for dividing and enclosing the Common Fields, Common Pastures, and Waste Lands, within the Parish of Doveridge alias Dovebridge, in the County of Derby.}}

| {{|Naturalization of Christian Noordingh Act 1791|personal|3|29-12-1790|repealed=n|archived=n|An Act for naturalizing Christian Noordingh.}}

| {{|Elizabeth Byng's Estate Act 1791|private|4|23-03-1791|repealed=n|archived=n|An Act for vesting the Estates devised by the Will of the Honourable Elizabeth Byng, deceased, in the County of Somerset, in Trustees, to be sold and for investing the Money arising by the Sale thereof in the Purchase of other Estates, to be settled to the like Uses to which the Estates so to be sold are subject.}}

| {{|Thomas Brand's Estate Act 1791|private|5|23-03-1791|repealed=n|archived=n|An Act to enable Trustees to cut down and sell Timber upon the Estates devised by the Will of Thomas Brand Esquire, and to invest the Monies arising therefrom in the Purchase of Lands and Hereditaments, to be settled to the Uses of the Will; and for other Purposes therein mentioned.}}

| {{|John Parlsow's Divorce Act 1791|personal|6|23-03-1791|repealed=n|archived=n|An Act to dissolve the Marriage of John Parslow Esquire with Elizabeth Hall his now Wife, and to enable him to marry again; and for other Purposes therein mentioned.}}

| {{|Kellington (Yorkshire, West Riding) Inclosure Act 1791|private|7|23-03-1791|repealed=n|archived=n|An Act for dividing and enclosing the Open Common Fields, Meadows, Ings, Pastures, and other Commonable Lands and Waste Grounds, within the Lordship or Liberty of Kellington, in the West Riding of the County of York.}}

| {{|Tadcaster (Yorkshire) Inclosure Act 1791|private|8|23-03-1791|repealed=n|archived=n|An Act for dividing and enclosing the Open Common Fields, Common Ings, Stinted Pasture, Common and Waste Grounds, within the Manor of Tadcaster, in the County of York, and County of the City of York.}}

| {{|Naturalization of Luke Foreman Act 1791|personal|9|23-03-1791|repealed=n|archived=n|An Act for naturalizing Luke Foreman Esquire.}}

| {{|Naturalization of Nicholas Martinius and James La Fontaine Act 1791|personal|10|23-03-1791|repealed=n|archived=n|An Act for naturalizing Nicholas Albert Martinius and James La Fontaine.}}

| {{|Naturalization of Peter and Joanna Godeffroy and John Thornton Act 1791|personal|11|23-03-1791|repealed=n|archived=n|An Act for naturalizing Peter Godeffroy, Johanna Catherine Godeffroy, his Wife, and John Thornton.}}

| {{|Naturalization of Jacob Krohn Act 1791|personal|12|23-03-1791|repealed=n|archived=n|An Act for naturalizing Jacob Krohn.}}

| {{|William Parkes's, Thomas and Mary Read's and Earl of Warwick's estates: exchange of lands in Warwickshire.|private|13|11-04-1791|repealed=n|archived=n|An Act for establishing and confirming an Agreement made between William Parkes and Thomas Read and Mary his Wife, and the Right Honourable George Earl Brooke, of Warwick Castle and Earl of Warwick, for the Exchange of certain Lands in the County of Warwick, and in the Borough of Warwick in the said County.}}

| {{|Dean and Chapter of Canterbury and Thomas Clutton: building leases agreement.|private|14|11-04-1791|repealed=n|archived=n|An Act for enabling the Dean and Chapter of Canterbury and Thomas Clutton to grant Building Leases, pursuant to an Agreement entered into for that Purpose.}}

| {{|Edward Day's estate: sale of Bath Estate (Barbados) and its stock and effects for the discharge of incumbrances and for other purposes.|private|15|11-04-1791|repealed=n|archived=n|An Act for vesting the Bath Estate situate in the Island of Barbadoes, and late belonging to Edward Day Esquire, deceased, together with the Stock and Effects upon or belonging to the same, in Trustees, to be sold and conveyed pursuant to an Agreement for that Purpose, and for applying the Money to arise by such Sale in discharging the Incumbrances thereon, and for other Purposes therein expressed.}}

| {{|Trustees of Henry Smith's Estate Act 1791|private|16|11-04-1791|repealed=n|archived=n|An Act for enabling the Trustees of Henry Smith Esquire, deceased, to accept a Conveyance of divers Hereditaments in the Parish of Reigate in the County of Surry, and an Annual or Fee-Farm Rent of Twentyfive Pounds, reserved out of or for the Manor of Mount Bures, in the County of Essex, and a yearly Rent of Thirty Pounds, Part of an Annual or Fee-Farm Rent of Forty Pounds, reserved out of or for the Manor of Heddington with the Hundred of Bullingdon in the County of Oxford in Exchange for the several Manors of Knowle, Seven Oaks, Kempsing and Seal, in the County of Kent, and divers Hereditaments in the several Parishes of Seven Oaks, Kempsing and Seal in the said County of Kent, and to convey the lastmentioned Hereditaments accordingly.}}

| {{|John Walford's divorce from Sophia Jeanes.|private|17|11-04-1791|repealed=n|archived=n|An Act to dissolve the Marriage of John Walford the Younger with Sophia Elizabeth Jeanes, his now Wife, and to enable him to marry again, and for other Purposes therein mentioned.}}

| {{|Great Kineton Field (Warwickshire) inclosure.|private|18|11-04-1791|repealed=n|archived=n|An Act for dividing and enclosing the Open and Common Field, and Commonable Land and Ground within the Manor and Parish of Great Kineton, otherwise Kington, in the County of Warwick, called Great Kineton Field.}}

| {{|Egginton (Derbyshire) inclosure.|private|19|11-04-1791|repealed=n|archived=n|An Act for dividing and enclosing the Common and Open Fields, Common Meadows, Common Pastures, Stinted Pastures, Commons, and Waste Lands within the Manor and Parish of Egginton in the County of Derby.}}

| {{|Kippax (Yorkshire, West Riding) inclosure.|private|20|11-04-1791|repealed=n|archived=n|An Act for dividing and enclosing the Open Parts of the Common Arable Fields, a Common Stinted Pasture called the Town Close, and a certain Common or Waste called the Hollings, within the Manor and Township of Kippax in the West Riding of the County of York.}}

| {{|Little Woolston (Buckinghamshire) inclosure.|private|21|11-04-1791|repealed=n|archived=n|An Act for dividing, allotting, and enclosing the Open and Common Fields, Common Meadows, Common Pastures, Waste and other Commonable Lands and Grounds, in the Parish of Little Woolston, in the County of Bucks.}}

| {{|Barkeston and Plungar (Leicestershire) inclosures.|private|22|11-04-1791|repealed=n|archived=n|An Act for dividing and enclosing the Open Common Fields, Pastures, Meadows, Woods, and other Commonable Lands and Waste Grounds, within the Parishes of Barston, otherwise Barkestone and Plungar, in the County of Leicester.}}

| {{|Hose (Leicestershire) inclosure.|private|23|11-04-1791|repealed=n|archived=n|An Act for dividing and enclosing the Open Common Fields, Meadows and Pastures, and other Commonable Lands and Waste Grounds within the Parish of Hose, in the County of Leicester.}}

| {{|Naturalization of Charles Cazenove and John Batard.|private|24|11-04-1791|repealed=n|archived=n|An Act for naturalizing Charles Theophilus Cazenove, and John Francis Batard.}}

| {{|Naturalization of Frederick Koithan.|private|25|11-04-1791|repealed=n|archived=n|An Act for naturalizing Frederick Koithan.}}

| {{|Naturalization of Henry Heyman.|private|26|11-04-1791|repealed=n|archived=n|An Act for naturalizing Henry Heyman the Younger.}}

| {{|Naturalization of Marquis de Choiseul.|private|27|11-04-1791|repealed=n|archived=n|An Act for naturalizing Jean Baptiste Armand de Choiseul, called Marquis de Choiseul.}}

| {{|Archbishop of York's and William Markham's estates: exchange of lands and hereditaments.|private|28|25-11-1790|note3=|repealed=n|archived=n|}}

| {{|Thomas Staunton's estate: vesting estates in Essex, Suffolk and Buckinghamshire in trustees, to be sold.|private|29|25-11-1790|note3=|repealed=n|archived=n|}}

| {{|Nathaniel Webb's estate: power to grant building and repairing leases at St. Giles in the Fields, Middlesex.|private|30|25-11-1790|note3=|repealed=n|archived=n|}}

| {{|Chadwick (Worcestershire) inclosure.|private|31|25-11-1790|note3=|repealed=n|archived=n|}}

| {{|Birdham Common (Sussex) inclosure.|private|32|25-11-1790|note3=|repealed=n|archived=n|}}

| {{|West Wittering Common and Cackham Green (Sussex) inclosures.|private|33|25-11-1790|note3=|repealed=n|archived=n|}}

| {{|Eastwood (Nottinghamshire) inclosure.|private|34|25-11-1790|note3=|repealed=n|archived=n|}}

| {{|Tarvin (Cheshire) inclosure.|private|35|25-11-1790|note3=|repealed=n|archived=n|}}

| {{|Christleton (Cheshire) inclosure.|private|36|25-11-1790|note3=|repealed=n|archived=n|}}

| {{|Norton-in-the-Clay (Yorkshire, North Riding) inclosure.|private|37|25-11-1790|note3=|repealed=n|archived=n|}}

| {{|Handsworth (Staffordshire) inclosure.|private|38|25-11-1790|note3=|repealed=n|archived=n|}}

| {{|Dame Jane Trafford: change of name to Southwell.|private|39|25-11-1790|note3=|repealed=n|archived=n|}}

| {{|Susanna and Jane Dormer's (infants) estate: enabling trustees to grant leases on fines, other estates to be purchased and settled.|private|40|25-11-1790|note3=|repealed=n|archived=n|}}

| {{|Thomas Hustler's and Richard Peirse's estates: division of property, tithes and hereditaments at Acklam, Middlesborough, Linthorpe and Airsholme (Yorkshire, North Riding) and settlement and limitation of their respective allotments.|private|41|25-11-1790|note3=|repealed=n|archived=n|}}

| {{|William, Meliora and Edward Dicconson's estate: vesting settled estates in Lincolnshire and in Wigan, Penwortham, Coppul, Charnock Richard, Croston, Worthington, Burscough and Dalton-in-Furness (Lancashire) in trustees,|note1= to raise money by sale or mortgage for the purchase of an estate at Parbold (Lancashire) to be settled to the same uses.|private|42|25-11-1790|note3=|repealed=n|archived=n|}}

| {{|Samuel Clowes's estate: vesting an estate in Lancashire in fee simple, settling an estate in lieu and enabling him to grant building leases over the newly settled estate.|private|43|25-11-1790|note3=|repealed=n|archived=n|}}

| {{|Marriage settlement of Sir Jacob Wolff: perfecting power of sale as it relates to the manor of Chulmleigh (Devon) and to estates in Devon and Hampshire.|private|44|25-11-1790|note3=|repealed=n|archived=n|}}

| {{|Charles Pierrepont's estate: enabling him, his successors and the life tenants under the will of the Duke of Kingston to grant building leases.|private|45|25-11-1790|note3=|repealed=n|archived=n|}}

| {{|Sir Charles Sheffield's estate: vesting part in trustees, to be sold, and purchase of others nearer to the family estates in Lincolnshire.|private|46|25-11-1790|note3=|repealed=n|archived=n|}}

| {{|Wilde's Charity's, Robert Sparrow's and Mary Bence's estates: exchange of estates in Suffolk.|private|47|25-11-1790|note3=|repealed=n|archived=n|}}

| {{|Heanor and Codnor (Derbyshire) inclosure.|private|48|25-11-1790|note3=|repealed=n|archived=n|}}

| {{|Gedney Fen (Lincolnshire) inclosure.|private|49|25-11-1790|note3=|repealed=n|archived=n|}}

| {{|Curdworth and Minworth (Warwickshire) inclosure.|private|50|25-11-1790|note3=|repealed=n|archived=n|}}

| {{|Chaddesden (Derbyshire) inclosure.|private|51|25-11-1790|note3=|repealed=n|archived=n|}}

| {{|Chippenham (Cambridgeshire) inclosure.|private|52|25-11-1790|note3=|repealed=n|archived=n|}}

| {{|Nylands with Badcombe (Somerset) inclosure.|private|53|25-11-1790|note3=|repealed=n|archived=n|}}

| {{|Stockton (Warwickshire) inclosure.|private|54|25-11-1790|note3=|repealed=n|archived=n|}}

| {{|Sheffield (Yorkshire, West Riding) inclosure.|private|55|25-11-1790|note3=|repealed=n|archived=n|}}

| {{|Leven (Yorkshire, East Riding) inclosure.|private|56|25-11-1790|note3=|repealed=n|archived=n|}}

| {{|Nettleton (Lincolnshire) inclosure.|private|57|25-11-1790|note3=|repealed=n|archived=n|}}

| {{|West and East Langton, Thorpe Langton and Tur Langton (Leicestershire) inclosure.|private|58|25-11-1790|note3=|repealed=n|archived=n|}}

| {{|Oddington (Oxfordshire) inclosure.|private|59|25-11-1790|note3=|repealed=n|archived=n|}}

| {{|Edingale Fields (Derbyshire) inclosure.|private|60|25-11-1790|note3=|repealed=n|archived=n|}}

| {{|Ludford (Lincolnshire) inclosure.|private|61|25-11-1790|note3=|repealed=n|archived=n|}}

| {{|Stoke Moor and Draycott Moor (Somerset) inclosure.|private|62|25-11-1790|note3=|repealed=n|archived=n|}}

| {{|Henry Fane: change of name to Cholmley and licence to bear the arms of the Cholmleys of Whitby.|private|63|25-11-1790|note3=|repealed=n|archived=n|}}

| {{|Edward Barrar: change of name to Acton.|private|64|25-11-1790|note3=|repealed=n|archived=n|}}

| {{|Thomas Leigh: change of name and arms to Hare.|private|65|25-11-1790|note3=|repealed=n|archived=n|}}

| {{|Naturalization of Francis Bonapace.|private|66|25-11-1790|note3=|repealed=n|archived=n|}}

| {{|Naturalization of Anthony Ravee.|private|67|25-11-1790|note3=|repealed=n|archived=n|}}

| {{|Henry Cecil's divorce from Emma Vernon, and other provisions.|private|68|25-11-1790|note3=|repealed=n|archived=n|}}

| {{|Hope, Lower Kinnerton, and Dodleston (Cheshire) inclosure.|private|69|25-11-1790|note3=|repealed=n|archived=n|}}

| {{|Alconbury with Weston (Huntingdonshire) inclosure.|private|70|25-11-1790|note3=|repealed=n|archived=n|}}

| {{|Baldwin Duppa Hancorn: change of name and arms to Duppa.|private|71|25-11-1790|note3=|repealed=n|archived=n|}}

| {{|Baldwin Hancorn: change of name and arms to Duppa.|private|72|25-11-1790|note3=|repealed=n|archived=n|}}
}}

1792 (32 Geo. 3)

The second session of the 17th Parliament of Great Britain, between 1 January 1792 and 15 June 1792.

See:

Public acts

| {{|Inhabited House Duties Act 1792|public|2|09-03-1792|repealed=y|archived=n|An Act to repeal the Duties on certain inhabited Houses, containing less than Seven Windows or Lights, granted by an Act of the Sixth Year of the Reign of His present Majesty.}}

| {{|Duties on Servants Act 1792|public|3|09-03-1792|repealed=y|archived=n|An Act for repealing the Duties on Female Servants.}}

| {{|Duties on Wagons, etc. Act 1792|public|4|09-03-1792|repealed=y|archived=n|An Act for repealing the Duties on Waggons, Wains, Carts, and other Carriages, granted by an Act of the Twenty-third Year of the Reign of His present Majesty.}}

| {{|Land Tax Act 1792|public|5|09-03-1792|repealed=y|archived=n|An Act for granting an Aid to His Majesty by a Land Tax to be raised in Great Britain, for the Service of the Year One thousand seven hundred and ninety-two.}}

| {{|Malt Duties Act 1792|public|6|09-03-1792|repealed=y|archived=n|An Act for continuing and granting to His Majesty certain Duties upon Malt, Mum, Cyder, and Perry, for the Service of the Year One thousand seven hundred and ninety-two.}}

| {{|Duties on Candles Act 1792|public|7|31-01-1792|note3=|repealed=y|archived=n|}}

| {{|Frauds in Excise Revenue Act 1792|public|8|31-01-1792|note3=|repealed=y|archived=n|}}

| {{|Exportation Act 1792|public|9|31-01-1792|note3=|repealed=y|archived=n|}}

| {{|Offences Against Excise Laws Act 1792|public|10|05-04-1792|repealed=y|archived=n|An Act for the better Execution of certain Warrants issued for the apprehending and committing Persons convicted of Offences against the Excise Laws.}}

| {{|Sales by Auction Act 1792|public|11|05-04-1792|repealed=y|archived=n|An Act to compel Auctioneers to declare whether Sales have been held under the Notices now required to be given by Law.}}

| {{|Reduction of National Debt Act 1792|public|12|05-04-1792|repealed=y|archived=n|An Act for granting to His Majesty the Sum of Four hundred thousand Pounds, to be issued and paid to the Governor and Company of the Bank of England, to be by them placed to the Account of the Commissioners for the Reduction of the National Debt.}}

| {{|Annuities to Duke, etc., of York Act 1792|public|13|05-04-1792|repealed=y|archived=n|An Act to enable His Majesty to make Provision for the Establishment of Their Royal Highnesses the Duke and Duchess of York and Albany; and also to settle an Annuity on Her Royal Highness during the Time of Her Natural Life, to commence from the Decease of His said Royal Highness, in case Her said Royal Highness shall servive him.}}

| {{|Trade with America Act 1792|public|14|30-03-1792|repealed=y|archived=n|An Act to continue the Laws now in Force, for regulating the Trade between the Subjects of His Majesty's Dominions, and the Inhabitants of the Territories belonging to the United States of America, so far as the same relate to the Trade and Commerce carried on between this Kingdom and the Inhabitants of the Countries belonging to the said United States.}}

| {{|Loans of Exchequer Bills Act 1792|public|15|30-03-1792|repealed=y|archived=n|An Act for raising a certain Sum of Money by Loans or Exchequer Bills, for the Service of the Year One thousand seven hundred and ninety-two.}}

| {{|Loans of Exchequer Bills Act 1792|public|16|30-03-1792|repealed=y|archived=n|An Act for raising a further Sum of Money by Loans or Exchequer Bills, for the Service of the Year One thousand seven hundred and ninety-two.}}

| {{|Marine Duty Act 1792|public|17|31-01-1792|note3=|repealed=y|archived=n|}}

| {{|Malt Duties Act 1792|public|18|31-01-1792|note3=|repealed=y|archived=n|}}

| {{|Mutiny Act 1792|public|19|31-01-1792|note3=|repealed=y|archived=n|}}

| {{|Poor, Staffordshire Act 1792|public|20|30-03-1792|repealed=y|archived=n|An Act for providing a Workhouse for the Reception of the Poor of the Parish of Stone, in the County of Stafford; and for regulating and employing the Poor therein.}}

| {{|Frauds in Excise Revenue Act 1792|public|21|31-01-1792|note3=|repealed=y|archived=n|}}

| {{|Fishery Act 1792|public|22|30-04-1792|repealed=y|archived=n|An Act to continue and amend several Laws relating to the Encouragement of the Fisheries carried on in the Greenland Seas and Davis's Streights, and to amend the Laws now in Force, for the Encouragement of the Fisheries carried on in the Seas to the Southward of the Greenland Seas and Davis's Streights.}}

| {{|Land Tax (Commissioners) Act 1792|public|23|30-04-1792|repealed=y|archived=n|An Act for rectifying Mistakes in the Names of several of the Commissioners appointed by an Act made in the last Session of Parliament, to put in Execution an Act made in the same Session, intituled, An Act for granting an Aid to His Majesty by a Land Tax, to be raised in Great Britain, for the Service of the Year One thousand seven hundred and ninety-one;" and for appointing other Commissioners together with those named in the first mentioned Act, to put in Execution an Act of this Session of Parliament, for granting an Aid to His Majesty by a Land Tax, to be raised in Great Britain, for the Service of the Year One thousand seven hundred and ninety-two; and for indemnifying such Persons as have acted as Commissioners for executing the said Act, for granting an Aid to His Majesty by a Land Tax to be raised in Great Britain, for the Service of the Year One thousand seven hundred and ninetyone.}}

| {{|Crown Lands in Privy Garden, Westminster Act 1792|public|24|30-04-1792|repealed=y|archived=n|An Act to repeal so much of an Act made in the Twenty-seventh Year of His present Majesty, as relates to the Sale of the House in Privy Garden, heretofore used as an Office for the Commissioners of the Lottery, and to enable His Majesty to grant the said Premises.}}

| {{|Bank of Scotland Act 1792|public|25|30-04-1792|repealed=y|archived=n|An Act to enable the Governor and Company of the Bank of Scotland, further to increase the Capital Stock of the said Company.}}

| {{|Militia Pay Act 1792|public|26|30-04-1792|repealed=y|archived=n|An Act for defraying the Charge of the Pay and Cloathing of the Militia, in that Part of Great Britain called England, for One Year, beginning the Twenty-fifth Day of March One thousand seven hundred and ninety-two.}}

| {{|Indemnity Act 1792|public|27|31-01-1792|note3=|repealed=y|archived=n|}}

| {{|Lottery Act 1792|public|28|30-04-1792|repealed=y|archived=n|An Act for granting to His Majesty a certain Sum of Money to be raised by a Lottery.}}

| {{|Wear Coal Trade Act 1792|public|29|30-04-1792|repealed=y|archived=n|An Act for establishing a permanent Fund for the Relief and Support of Skippers and Keelmen, employed in the Coal Trade on the River Wear, in the County of Durham, who by Sickness or other accidental Misfortunes, or by old Age, shall not be able to maintain themselves and their Families, and also for the Relief of the Widows and Children of such Skippers and Keelmen.}}

| {{|Bridgnorth Church Act 1792|public|30|30-03-1792|repealed=y|archived=n|An Act for taking down the Church, Chancel and Tower, belonging to the Parish of Saint Mary Magdalen in Bridgnorth, in the County of Salop; and for rebuilding the same, and for enlarging the Burial Ground of the said Parish.}}

| {{|Canvey Island, Sea Defences Act 1792|public|31|30-04-1792|repealed=y|archived=n|An Act for more effectually embanking, draining, and otherwise improving the Island of Canvey, in the County of Essex.}}

| {{|Customs Act 1792|public|32|31-01-1792|note3=|repealed=y|archived=n|}}

| {{|Navy Act 1792|public|33|31-01-1792|note3=|repealed=y|archived=n|}}

| {{|Navy Act 1792|public|34|31-01-1792|note3=|repealed=y|archived=n|}}

| {{|Appropriation Act 1792|public|35|08-05-1792|repealed=y|archived=n|An Act for granting to His Majesty a certain Sum of Money out of the consolidated Fund; and for applying certain Monies therein mentioned for the Service of the Year One thousand seven hundred and ninety-two; for further appropriating the Supplies granted in this Session of Parliament, and for making forth Duplicates of Exchequer Bills, Lottery Tickets, Certificates, Receipts, Annuity Orders, or other Orders lost, burnt, or otherwise destroyed.}}

| {{|Continuance of Laws Act 1792|public|36|31-01-1792|note3=|repealed=y|archived=n|}}

| {{|Importation and Exportation Act 1792|public|37|31-01-1792|note3=|repealed=y|archived=n|}}

| {{|Montrose Bridge Act 1792|public|38|30-04-1792|repealed=y|archived=n|An Act for building a Bridge over the River South Esk, at or near the Town of Montrose, in the County of Forfar, and for making suitable Approaches thereto.}}

| {{|Saint Botolph Church Aldersgate Act 1792|public|39|08-05-1792|repealed=y|archived=n|An Act to enable the Inhabitants of the Parish of Saint Botolph-without-Aldersgate, in the City of London, to raise Money for paying and discharging the Debts that have been contracted in repairing their Parish Church and building a new Workhouse.}}

| {{|Excise Laws, Glass Act 1792|public|40|11-06-1792|repealed=y|archived=n|An Act for amending the Laws of Excise, relating to the Manufactory of Flint Glass.}}

| {{|Auction Duty Act 1792|public|41|11-06-1792|repealed=y|archived=n|An Act to exempt Whale Oil and other Articles therein mentioned and sold by Auction in Great Britain, from the Duty imposed on such Sales.}}

| {{|Offices of Court of Chancery Act 1792|public|42|11-06-1792|repealed=y|archived=n|An Act to empower the High Court of Chancery to lay out a further Sum of the Suitors Money upon proper Securities, and for applying the Interest towards discharging the Expences of the Office of the Accountant General, and for building Offices for the Masters in Ordinary in Chancery, and a Public Office for the Suitors of the said Court, and Offices for the Secretaries of Bankrupts and Lunaticks, and for building Repositories for securing the Title Deeds of the Suitors of the said Court, and the Records and Proceedings of the Commissioners of Bankrupts and Lunaticks.}}

| {{|Customs Act 1792|public|43|31-01-1792|note3=|repealed=y|archived=n|}}

| {{|Silk Manufacture Act 1792|public|44|11-06-1792|repealed=y|archived=n|An Act for extending the Provisions of an Act made in the Thirteenth Year of the Reign of His present Majesty, intituled, "An Act to empower the Magistrates therein mentioned to settle and regulate the Wages of Persons employed in the Silk Manufacture within their respective Jurisdictions, "To Manufactories of Silk mixed with other Materials, and for the more effectual Punishment of Buyers and Receivers of Silk purloined and embezzled by Persons employed in the Manufacture thereof."}}

| {{|Rogues and Vagabonds Act 1792|public|45|11-06-1792|repealed=y|archived=n|An Act to explain and amend an Act made in the Seventeenth Year of the Reign of His late Majesty King George the Second, intituled, "An Act to amend and make more effectual the Laws relating to Rogues, Vagabonds, and other idle and disorderly Persons, and to Houses of Correction."}}

| {{|Courts Newfoundland Act 1792|public|46|15-06-1792|repealed=y|archived=n|An Act for establishing Courts of Judicature in the Island of Newfoundland, and the Islands adjacent.}}

| {{|Hackney Coaches Act 1792|public|47|11-06-1792|repealed=y|archived=n|An Act to explain and amend so much of an Act made in the Seventh Year of the Reign of His present Majesty, as relates to Hackney Coaches and Chairs.}}

| {{|Middlesex Sessions Act 1792|public|48|11-06-1792|repealed=y|archived=n|An Act to empower the Justices of the Peace for the County of Middlesex to continue a Session of the Peace and of Oyer and Terminer, begun to be holden before the Essoign Day of Term, and Sitting of the King's Bench at Westminster, notwithstanding the happening of such Essoign Day, or the Sitting of the said Court of Kings Bench at Westminster, or elsewhere, in the said County of Middlesex.}}

| {{|Importation Act 1792|public|49|31-01-1792|note3=|repealed=y|archived=n|}}

| {{|Coast Trade Act 1792|public|50|31-01-1792|note3=|repealed=y|archived=n|}}

| {{|Stamp Duty Act 1792|public|51|31-01-1792|note3=|repealed=y|archived=n|}}

| {{|Slave Trade Act 1792|public|52|11-06-1792|repealed=y|archived=n|An Act to continue, for a limited Time, several Acts of Parliament for regulating the shipping and carrying Slaves in British Vessels from the Coast of Africa.}}

| {{|Justice of Peace, the Metropolis Act 1792|public|53|15-06-1792|repealed=y|archived=n|An Act for the more effectual Administration of the Office of a Justice of the Peace, in such Parts of the Counties of Middlesex and Surrey, as lie in and near the Metropolis, and for the more effectual Prevention of Felonies.}}

| {{|Customs Act 1792|public|54|31-01-1792|note3=|repealed=y|archived=n|}}

| {{|Reduction of National Debt Act 1792|public|55|15-06-1792|repealed=y|archived=n|An Act to render more effectual an Act, made in the Twenty-sixth Year of His present Majesty's Reign, intituled, "An Act for vesting certain Sums in Commissioners at the End of every Quarter of a Year, to be by them applied to the Reduction of the National Debt;" and to direct the Application of an additional Sum to the Reduction of the said Debt, in Case of future Loans.}}

| {{|Servants' Characters Act 1792|note1=|public|56|15-06-1792|repealed=y|archived=n|An Act for preventing the counterfeiting of Certificates of the Characters of Servants.|note4= }}

| {{|Parish Apprentices Act 1792|note1=|public|57|11-06-1792|repealed=y|archived=n|An Act for the further Regulation of Parish Apprentices.}}

| {{|Information in Nature of Quo Warranto Act 1792|public|58|11-06-1792|repealed=y|archived=n|An Act for the Amendment of the Law in Proceedings upon Information in Nature of Quo Warranto.}}

| {{|Licensing of Alehouses Act 1792|public|59|11-06-1792|repealed=y|archived=n|An Act to amend so much of two Acts made in the Twenty-sixth and Twenty-ninth Years of the Reign of His late Majesty King George the Second, as relates to the licensing of Alehouse Keepers and Victuallers; and for better regulating Alehouses, and the Manner of granting such Licences in future; and also of granting Licences to Persons selling Wines to be drank in their Houses.}}

| {{|Libel Act 1792|note1=|public|60|15-06-1792|repealed=y|archived=n|An Act to remove Doubts respecting the Functions of Juries in Cases of Libel.|note4= }}

| {{|Indemnity to Proprietors, etc., of Newspapers Act 1792|public|61|11-06-1792|repealed=y|archived=n|An Act to indemnify Persons being Proprietors, Printers, and Editors of Newspapers and other Publications, from certain Penalties incurred under several Acts therein mentioned, relative to Lotteries.}}

| {{|Coaches, Bond Street Act 1792|public|62|11-06-1792|repealed=y|archived=n|An Act for removing the Stand of Hackney Coaches out of New Bond Street and Old Bond Street, in the Parish of Saint George Hanover Square, in the Liberty of Westminster.}}

| {{|Scottish Episcopalians Relief Act 1792|note1=|public|63|15-06-1792|repealed=y|archived=n|An Act for granting Relief to Pastors, Ministers, and Lay Persons of the Episcopal Communion in Scotland.}}

| {{|Saint Bride Church Act 1792|public|64|08-05-1792|repealed=y|archived=n|An Act for repairing, altering, and improving the Parish Church of Saint Bridget, otherwise Saint Bride, in the City of London; and for providing a Workhouse for the same Parish.}}

| {{|Trade Act 1792|public|65|31-01-1792|note3=|repealed=y|archived=n|}}

| {{|Saint Pancras Church Act 1792|public|66|08-05-1792|repealed=y|archived=n|An Act for providing an additional burying Ground for the use of the Parish of Saint Pancras, in the County of Middlesex, and for shutting up the present Footpath leading through the Church Yard, and making a commodious one in lieu thereof.}}

| {{|Marines Act 1792|public|67|31-01-1792|note3=|repealed=y|archived=n|}}

| {{|Renfrew Roads and Bridges Act 1792|public|68|08-05-1792|repealed=y|archived=n|An Act for making effectual the Statute Labour in the County of Renfrew, and for levying Conversion Money in Lieu of Labour in certain Cases, and for otherwise regulating, making, and repairing High Roads and Bridges in the said County.}}

| {{|Manchester and Salford: Improvement Act 1792|public|69|11-06-1792|repealed=y|archived=n|An Act for cleansing, lighting, watching, and regulating the Streets, Lanes, Passages, and Places within the Towns of Manchester and Salford, in the County Palatine of Lancaster; for widening and rendering more commodious several of the said Streets, Lanes, and Passages; and for other Purposes therein mentioned.}}

| {{|Tewkesbury: Poor Relief Act 1792|public|70|11-06-1792|repealed=y|archived=n|An Act for the better Relief and Employment of the Poor, of and belonging to the Parish of Tewkesbury, in the County of Gloucester.}}

| {{|Great and Little Bolton: Improvement Act 1792|public|71|11-06-1792|repealed=y|archived=n|An Act for enclosing, dividing, and allotting a certain Common or Waste Ground called Bolton Moor, and other the Commons and Waste Grounds within the Township of Great Bolton, in the County Palatine of Lancaster; and for widening, paving, lighting, watching, cleansing, and regulating the Streets, Lanes, Passages, and Places, within the Towns of Great Bolton and Little Bolton; and for supplying the said Towns with Water, and for providing FireEngines and Fire-Men; and for removing and preventing Nuisances, Encroachments, and Annoyances; and for licensing and regulating Hackney Coaches and Chairs within the said Towns.}}

| {{|Turner's Patent Act 1792|public|72|15-06-1792|repealed=y|archived=n|An Act for vesting in James Turner, his Executors, Administrators, and Assigns, the sole Use and Property of a certain Yellow Colour of his Invention, throughout that Part of Great Britain called England, the Dominion of Wales, and Town of Berwick-upon-Tweed, for a limited Time.}}

| {{|Booth's Patent Act 1792|public|73|15-06-1792|repealed=y|archived=n|An Act for more effectually securing to Joseph Booth, and to the Public, the Benefit of a certain Invention or Discovery therein mentioned, for which he hath obtained Letters Patent, under the Great Seal of Great Britain.}}

| {{|Ramsgate Harbour and Sandwich Act 1792|public|74|11-06-1792|repealed=y|archived=n|An Act for the Maintenance and Improvement of the Harbour of Ramsgate, in the County of Kent; and for cleansing, amending, and preserving the Haven of Sandwich, in the same County.}}

| {{|Whitehaven: Improvement Act 1792|public|75|15-06-1792|repealed=y|archived=n|An Act for further enlarging and improving the Harbour of Whitehaven, in the County of Cumberland.}}

| {{|Liverpool Church Act 1792|public|76|11-06-1792|repealed=y|archived=n|An Act for building a new Church or Chapel, within the Town and Parish of Liverpool, in the County Palatine of Lancaster.}}

| {{|Gloucestershire: Small Debts Act 1792|public|77|11-06-1792|repealed=y|archived=n|An Act for the more easy and speedy Recovery of Small Debts, within the Hundreds of Cirencester, Crowthorne, and Minty, Brightwells, Barrow, Rapsgate, Bradley, Bisley, and Longtree, commonly called the Seven Hundreds of Cirencester, in the County of Gloucester.}}

| {{|Derby: Improvement Act 1792|public|78|15-06-1792|repealed=y|archived=n|An Act for paving, cleansing, lighting, and otherwise improving the Streets, Lanes, and other public Passages and Places within the Borough of Derby; and for selling a certain Piece of Waste Ground, situate within the said Borough, called Nun's Green, towards defraying the Expence of the said Improvements.}}

| {{|Boston Pilotage Act 1792|public|79|08-05-1792|repealed=y|archived=n|An Act for amending an Act of the Sixteenth Year of His present Majesty, relating to the Haven and Harbour of Boston, in the County of Lincoln, and for regulating the mooring and removing of Ships and other Vessels within the said Haven and Harbour, and for removing Obstructions therein.}}

| {{|Boston: Improvement Act 1792|public|80|08-05-1792|repealed=y|archived=n|An Act for better paving, cleansing, and otherwise improving the Borough of Boston, in the County of Lincoln.}}

| {{|Birmingham Canal: Navigation Act 1792|public|81|30-04-1792|repealed=y|archived=n|An Act for making and maintaining a Navigable Canal, from or from near Wyrley Bank, in the County of Stafford, to communicate with the Birmingham and Birmingham and Fazeley Canal, at or near the Town of Wolverhampton, in the said County; and also certain Collateral Cuts therein described, from the said intended Canal.}}

| {{|Bristol Gaol Act 1792|public|82|15-06-1792|repealed=y|archived=n|An Act for building a New Gaol, a Penitentiary House, and House of Correction, within the City of Bristol, and for regulating, maintaining, and supporting the same; and for disposing of the present Common Gaol of the said City of Bristol, and County of the same City, and for other Purposes.}}

| {{|Leigh and Deerhurst Canal Act 1792|public|83|11-06-1792|repealed=y|archived=n|An Act for making and maintaining a Navigable Canal from the Foot of Coombe Hill, in the Parish of Leigh, in the County of Gloucester, to join the River Severn at or near a Place called Fisher's, otherwise Fletcher's Leap, in the Parish of Deerhurst, in the said County.}}

| {{|Manchester and Oldham Canal Act 1792|public|84|11-06-1792|repealed=y|archived=n|An Act for making a Navigable Canal from Manchester, to or near Ashton-under-Lyne and Oldham, in the County Palatine of Lancaster.}}

| {{|Whitchurch, Salop: Poor Relief Act 1792|public|85|11-06-1792|repealed=y|archived=n|An Act for the better Relief and Employment of the Poor, of and within such Part of the Parish of Whitchurch, as maintains its own Poor, and lies within the County of Salop.}}

| {{|Broadstairs Pier Act 1792|public|86|11-06-1792|repealed=y|archived=n|An Act for repairing or re-building the Pier adjoining to the Harbour of Broadstairs, in the Isle of Thanet, in the County of Kent, and for the better preserving the said Harbour; and for removing and preventing Obstructions, Nuisances, and Annoyances, and regulating the Mooring of Ships and Vessels within the said Harbour.}}

| {{|Hereford Cathedral Act 1792|public|87|11-06-1792|repealed=y|archived=n|An Act to enable the Dean and Chapter of Hereford to re-build the West End of the Cathedral Church of Hereford, and to repair other Parts thereof.}}

| {{|Lane End Chapel, Stoke upon Trent Act 1792|public|88|11-06-1792|repealed=y|archived=n|An Act for re-building the Chapel, and enlarging the Chapel Yard of Lane End, within the Parish of Stoke-upon-Trent, in the County of Stafford.}}

| {{|Leeds Church Act 1792|public|89|11-06-1792|repealed=y|archived=n|An Act for building a New Church or Chapel in the Town of Leeds, in the West Riding of the County of York.}}

| {{|Sunderland: Improvement Act 1792|public|90|31-01-1792|note3=|repealed=y|archived=n|}}

| {{|Land Drained at Great Carlton, Lincolnshire Act 1792|public|91|11-06-1792|repealed=y|archived=n|An Act for more effectually draining and preserving certain Low Lands, within the Parish of Great Carlton, in the County of Lincoln.}}

| {{|Beer, Devon, Harbour Act 1792|public|92|11-06-1792|repealed=y|archived=n|An Act for making a Harbour in the Cove of Beer, in the County of Devon.}}

| {{|Leith and Bruntisland Ferries, etc. Act 1792|public|93|11-06-1792|repealed=y|archived=n|An Act for improving the Communication between the County of Edinburgh and the County of Fife, by the Passages or Ferries cross the Frith of Forth, between Leith and Newhaven, in the County of Edinburgh, and Kinghorn and Bruntisland, in the County of Fife; and for rendering the Harbours and landing Places more commodious.}}

| {{|Nith Fisheries Act 1792|public|94|11-06-1792|repealed=y|archived=n|An Act for regulating and improving the Salmon Fisheries in the River Nith, in the County of Dumfries.}}

| {{|Salop: Poor Relief Act 1792|public|95|11-06-1792|repealed=y|archived=n|An Act for the better Relief and Employment of the Poor within the several Parishes of Atcham, Wroxeter, Berrington, Cund, Eaton Constantine, Kenley, Leighton, Uffington, and Upton Magna, and the Chapelry of Cressage, in the County of Salop.}}

| {{|Montgomery: Poor Relief Act 1792|public|96|11-06-1792|repealed=y|archived=n|An Act for the better Relief and Employment of the Poor belonging to the Parishes of Montgomery and Pool, and certain other Parishes and Places therein mentioned, in the Counties of Montgomery and Salop.}}

| {{|Whitchurch Bridge Act 1792|public|97|11-06-1792|repealed=y|archived=n|An Act for building a Bridge, at or near the Ferry over the River Thames, from Whitchurch in the County of Oxford, to the opposite Shore in the Parish of Pangbourn, in the County of Berks.}}

| {{|Taunton Hospital Act 1792|public|98|15-06-1792|repealed=y|archived=n|An Act for appointing Commissioners to sell and dispose of a certain unfinished Building at or near Taunton, in the County of Somerset, intended for a Publick Hospital or Infirmary, and of a Piece of Ground belonging thereto, in case a sufficient Sum of Money shall not be raised by Subscription within a limited Time, for finishing the said Building, and paying the Money due on Account thereof.}}

| {{|Worcester: Poor Relief, Burial Ground and Hopmarket Act 1792|public|99|08-05-1792|repealed=y|archived=n|An Act for the better Relief and Employment of the Poor of the several Parishes within the City of Worcester, and of the Parishes of Saint Martin and Saint Clement, which are Part within the City of Worcester and Part within the County of Worcester, and for providing a Burial Ground for the use of such Parishes.}}

| {{|Nottingham Canal Act 1792|public|100|08-05-1792|repealed=y|archived=n|An Act for making and maintaing a Navigable Canal from the Cromford Canal, in the County of Nottingham, to or near to the Town of Nottingham, and to the River Trent near Nottingham Trent Bridge; and also certain collateral Cuts therein described, from the said intended Canal.}}

| {{|Westmoreland Canals Act 1792|public|101|11-06-1792|repealed=y|archived=n|An Act for making and maintaining a Navigable Canal from Kirkby Kendal, in the County of Westmorland, to West Houghton, in the County Palatine of Lancaster; and also a Navigable Branch from the said intended Canal at or near Borwick, to or near Warton Cragg, and also another Navigable Branch from at or near Gale Moss, by Charley, to or near Duxbury, in the said County Palatine of Lancaster.}}

| {{|Monmouthshire Canal: Navigation Act 1792|public|102|11-06-1792|repealed=y|archived=n|An Act for making and maintaining a Navigable Cut or Canal from or from some Place near Pontnewynydd into the River Usk, at or near the Town of Newport, and a Collateral Cut or Canal from the same, at or near a Place called Cryndau Farm, to or near to Crumlin Bridge, all in the County of Monmouth; and for making and maintaining Railways or Stone Roads, from such Cuts or Canals to several Iron Works and Mines in the Counties of Monmouth and Brecknock.}}

| {{|Portsea: Improvement Act 1792|public|103|11-06-1792|repealed=y|archived=n|An Act for the better paving, cleansing, widening, and regulating the Streets, Courts, Roads, Lanes, Ways, Rows, Alleys, and Public Passages and Places, within the Town of Portsea, in the County of Southampton; and for removing and preventing Nuisances, Annoyances, and Obstructions within the said Town.}}

| {{|Carmarthen: Improvement Act 1792|public|104|11-06-1792|repealed=y|archived=n|An Act for building a New Goal and House of Correction, for the Town and County Borough of Carmarthen, and for supplying the said Town and County Borough, and the Liberties thereof with Water; and for paving, watching, lighting, cleansing, and regulating the Streets, Lanes, Ways, Roads and Public Passages, and for widening and making the same more commodious; and removing and preventing Nuisances, Annoyances, and Obstructions therein, and for other Purposes.}}

| {{|Medway: Navigation Act 1792|public|105|15-06-1792|repealed=y|archived=n|An Act for improving the Navigation of the River Medway, from the Town of Maidstone, through the several Parishes of Maidstone, Boxley, Allington, and Aylesford, in the County of Kent.}}

| {{|Sleaford: Navigation Act 1792|public|106|11-06-1792|repealed=y|archived=n|An Act for making and maintaining a Navigation from Sleaford Castle Causeway, through the Town of Sleaford, in the County of Lincoln, along the Course of Sleaford Mill Stream and Kyme Eau, to the River Witham, at or near Chappel Hill, in the same County; and for making necessary Cuts for better effecting the said Navigation.}}

| {{|Tattershall Canal Act 1792|public|107|11-06-1792|repealed=y|archived=n|An Act for enlarging and improving the Canal called Tattershall Canal, from the River Witham to the Town of Tattershall, and extending the same into the River Bain, and for making the said River Bain navigable from thence to or into the Town of Horncastle, all in the County of Lincoln; and also for amending and rendering complete the navigable Communication between the said River Witham and the Fosdike Canal, through the High Bridge, in the City of Lincoln.}}

| {{|Isle of Ely: Drainage Act 1792|public|108|11-06-1792|repealed=y|archived=n|An Act for dividing, allotting, and enclosing the Commons and Waste Grounds, within the Town or Hamlet of March, in the Manor and Parish of Doddington, in the Isle of Ely, and County of Cambridge; and for altering and amending an Act passed in the Thirtieth Year of the Reign of His late Majesty King George the Second, for draining and preserving certain Fen Lands, Low Grounds, and Commons, in the Townships or Hamlets of March and Wimblington, and in the Parish of Upwell, in the Isle of Ely, and County of Cambridge.}}

| {{|Hull: Drainage Act 1792|public|109|11-06-1792|repealed=y|archived=n|An Act for dividing, enclosing, draining, and improving the Open Fields, Meadows, Pastures, Commons, and Waste Grounds, within the several Townships or Hamlets of Hessle, Anlaby, and Tranby, in the County of the Town of Kingston-upon-Hull; and for making a Compensation, in Lieu of Tythe, for certain ancient enclosed Lands within the said several Townships or Hamlets, and also within the Township or Hamlet of Wooferton, otherwise Wolfreton, in the same County.}}

| {{|Hexham: Inclosure Act 1792|public|110|11-01-1792|repealed=y|archived=n|An Act for dividing and enclosing certain Parts of the Commons, Moors, or Tracts of Waste Land, called Hexamshire, and Allendale Common, and also certain Town Fields within the Regality or Manor of Hexam, in the County of Northumberland; and for stinting the Depasturing of the other Parts of the said Commons, Moors, or Waste Lands.}}

| {{|Norwich to Thetford Road Act 1792|public|111|09-03-1792|repealed=y|archived=n|An Act for continuing and amending an Act of the Seventh Year of His present Majesty, for amending the Road from the End of the Town Close, in the County of the City of Norwich, to the Chalk Pits near Thetford, in the County of Norfolk.}}

| {{|Norwich to Swaffham Road Act 1792|public|112|09-03-1792|repealed=y|archived=n|An Act for continuing and amending an Act of the Tenth Year of His present Majesty, for amending and widening the Road from Saint Benedict's Gate, in the County of the City of Norwich, to Swaffham, in the County of Norfolk, and from Halfpenny Bridge, in Honingham, to the Bounds of Yaxham; and also a Lane called Hangman's Lane, near the Gates of the said City.}}

| {{|Durham and Northumberland Roads Act 1792|public|113|30-03-1792|repealed=y|archived=n|An Act for altering, raising, widening, repairing and preserving the Road leading from the North End of the Turnpike Road called The Coal Road, near West Auckland, in the County of Durham, to the Elsdon Turnpike Road at or near Elishaw, in the County of Northumberland; and for erecting, building, and making necessary and convenient Bridges, Mounts, and Batteries upon the same.}}

| {{|Wiltshire Roads Act 1792|public|114|30-03-1792|repealed=y|archived=n|An Act for continuing the Term, and altering and enlarging the Powers of an Act of the Thirteenth Year of His present Majesty, for repairing the Road from Cherrill, through Calne to Studley Bridge, and from Cherrill to the Three Mile Borough at the Top of Cherrill Hill, in the County of Wilts; and for more effectually amending the Turnpike Road from Chittoe Heath to the Town of Calne.}}

| {{|Horsham Roads Act 1792|public|115|30-03-1792|repealed=y|archived=n|An Act for enlarging the Term, and altering the Powers of an Act made in the Eleventh Year of His present Majesty's Reign, for repairing and widening the Roads from Hand Cross to Corner House, and from thence to the Turnpike Road leading from Horsham to Steyning, and from Corner House aforesaid, to the Maypole in the Town of Henfield, in the County of Sussex; and also for keeping in Repair a certain Branch of Road leading from the Direction Post near a certain Place called The Crab Tree, in the Parish of Beeding, otherwise Seal, through the Parishes of Nuthurst and Horsham, to the Town of Horsham, in the said County.}}

| {{|Warwick Roads Act 1792|public|116|30-03-1792|repealed=y|archived=n|An Act for enlarging the Term of an Act of the Tenth Year of His present Majesty, for repairing and widening the Road from Upton, in the Parish of Ratley, to the North End of Bridge Street, in the Town of Great Kington, and from thence to the Guide Post at the Town of Wellesbourne Hastings, in the County of Warwick.}}

| {{|Kent Roads Act 1792|public|117|30-03-1792|repealed=y|archived=n|An Act for repairing and widening the Road leading out of the Turnpike Road from Dover, through Folkestone to Hythe, at a certain Place called Canterbury Lane, within the Liberty of the Town of Folkestone, to a certain Place in the Parish of Folkestone called Mudshole; and for making a new Road from thence, through a certain Field called Yaldergates, through Rainden Wood over Swingfield Minnis, through Denton; and for repairing and widening the Road from thence to the Direction Post on Barham Downs, in the Parish of Barham, at the Four Vents.}}

| {{|Yorkshire and Durham Roads Act 1792|public|118|30-03-1792|repealed=y|archived=n|An Act for enlarging and altering the Terms and Powers of two Acts of Parliament, made and passed in the Eighteenth and Twenty-second Years of the Reign of His late Majesty King George the Second, for repairing the High Road leading from Boroughbridge, in the County of York, through Northallerton in the same County, to Croft Bridge on the River Tees, and from thence through Darlington, in the County of Durham, to the City of Durham, and for reducing the said Acts into one; and for the more effectually repairing and keeping in Repair the said Road.}}

| {{|Kingston to Sheetbridge Road Act 1792|public|119|30-03-1792|repealed=y|archived=n|An Act for amending, widening and keeping in Repair the several Roads or Branches of Road leading from the Parishes of Yoxford, Saxmundbam, and Benhall, in the County of Suffolk, to the Town of Aldeburgh, in the said County.}}

| {{|Edinburgh Linlithgow and Lanark Roads etc Act 1792|public|120|08-05-1792|repealed=y|archived=n|An Act to enlarge the Term and Powers of an Act made in the Eleventh Year of His present Majesty's Reign, intituled, "An Act to enlarge the Term and Powers of so much of an Act made in the Twentyfourth Year of the Reign of King George the Second, as relates to the repairing the Road from Cramond Bridge to the Town of Queensferry, in the County of Linlithgow."}}

| {{|Ayr Roads Act 1792|public|121|31-01-1792|note3=|repealed=y|archived=n|}}

| {{|Lanark and Hamilton Roads Act 1792|public|122|11-06-1792|repealed=y|archived=n|An Act for making, amending, widening, and keeping in Repair the Roads from the New Bridge over the Water of Almond, on the Confines of the Counties of Edinburgh and Linlithgow, by the Town of Bathgate to Baillieston, in the County of Lanerk; and for making, amending, widening, and keeping in Repair certain Branches of Road from the said Line of Road; and for building a Bridge over the Water of Avon at Torphichen Mill; and for discharging the Trustees for executing Two Acts passed in the Twenty-sixth and Twenty-seventh Years of the Reign of His late Majesty King George the Second, and Two Acts passed in the Fourteenth and Thirty-first Years of the Reign of His present Majesty, from the Care of such Part of the Road from Newhouse Inn to Glasgow as leads from the Confines of the Parishes of Monkland and Shotts, to the East Boundary of Baillieston aforesaid, and putting the same under the Power of the Trustees appointed by this Act.}}

| {{|Peebles Roads Act 1792|public|123|11-06-1792|repealed=y|archived=n|An Act for enlarging the Terms and Powers of several Acts of the Twenty-sixth Year of His late Majesty's Reign, and of the Eleventh and Fifteenth Years of His present Majesty's Reign, for repairing the High Roads in the County of Peebles, and for making the said Acts more effectual, and for better regulating the Statute Labour within the said County.}}

| {{|Lanark Roads Act 1792|public|124|11-06-1792|repealed=y|archived=n|An Act for continuing the Term and altering the Powers of so much of an Act made in the Twelfth Year of the Reign of His present Majesty as relates to the repairing and widening several Roads leading through the County of Lanerk.}}

| {{|Queensferry Roads Act 1792|public|125|31-01-1792|note3=|repealed=y|archived=n|}}

| {{|Suffolk Roads Act 1792|public|126|31-01-1792|note3=|repealed=y|archived=n|}}

| {{|Durham Roads Act 1792|public|127|05-04-1792|repealed=y|archived=n|An Act for amending, widening, and keeping in Repair the Road leading from the Hoodgate, at the West End of the Town of Middleton, in Teesdale, in the County of Durham, to the Gate in the new Enclosure called The Edge, near the Collieries called West Pitts, in the Parish of Saint Andrew's Auckland, in the same County, and also a Branch from the said Road, at or near the Head of the Town of Egleston to Egleston Bridge, over the River Tees.}}

| {{|Derby and Cheshire Roads Act 1792|public|128|05-04-1792|repealed=y|archived=n|An Act for repairing and improving the Road from the Town of Chapel-en-le-Frith, to or near to Enterclough Bridge, in the County of Derby; and also the Road from the Village of Hayfield to Marple Bridge, in the said County; and also the Road from the Village of Glossop, to a certain Gate called Claylands Gate, in the Township of Longdendale, on or near to the Side of the Turnpike Road leading from Mottram to Woodhead, in the County Palatine of Chester.}}

| {{|Cambridge Roads Act 1792|public|129|05-04-1792|repealed=y|archived=n|An Act for amending, widening, and keeping in Repair the Road leading from Swanspool Bridge, in the City of Peterborough, in the Town of Thorney, in the Isle of Ely, in the County of Cambridge, and for altering the Course of some Part of the said Road.}}

| {{|Somerset Roads Act 1792|public|130|05-04-1792|repealed=y|archived=n|An Act for continuing and amending two Acts of the Twenty-sixth Year of King George the Second, and the Eighteenth Year of His present Majesty, for repairing, amending, and widening the Road leading from the Red Post, in the Parish of Fivehead, through the Towns of Langport and Somerton to Butwell, and several other Roads therein mentioned, in the County of Somerset; and for repairing, amending, and widening certain other Roads within the said County.}}

| {{|Leeds to Wakefield Road Act 1792|public|131|30-04-1792|repealed=y|archived=n|An Act for enlarging the Term and Powers of two Acts of the Thirty-first Year of King George the Second, and the Tenth Year of His present Majesty, so far as relates to the Road from Leeds to Wakefield, in the County of York.}}

| {{|Yorkshire Roads Act 1792|public|132|30-04-1792|repealed=y|archived=n|An Act to continue the Term of two Acts of the Seventeenth Year of King George the Second, and the Eleventh Year of His present Majesty, for repairing the Road leading from the End of Middleton Tyas Lane, over Gatherly Moor, to Greta Bridge, and from thence to Bowes, in the North Riding of the County of York.}}

| {{|Yorkshire Roads Act 1792|public|133|30-04-1792|repealed=y|archived=n|An Act for enlarging the Term and Powers of an Act passed in the Eleventh Year of the Reign of His present Majesty, intituled, "An Act for repairing and widening the Road from the Low Water Mark of the River Humber, at or near Brough Ferry, in the Parish of Elloughton, in the East Riding of the County of York, to the North End of the Town of Brough, and from thence through South Cave to Coney Clappers, in South Newbald Holmes, in the said Riding."}}

| {{|Buckingham and Hanwell Road Act 1792|public|134|30-04-1792|repealed=y|archived=n|An Act for continuing and amending two Acts of the Seventeenth Year of King George the Second, and the Ninth Year of His present Majesty, so far as relates to repairing the Road from the Town of Buckingham to the North Extent of the Parish of Hanwell, in the County of Oxford.}}

| {{|Yorkshire and Durham Roads Act 1792|public|135|30-04-1792|repealed=y|archived=n|An Act for enlarging and altering the Terms and Powers of two several Acts of Parliament made and passed in the Twenty-first and Twenty-ninth Years of the Reign of His late Majesty King George the Second, for repairing the High Road from the Town of Bowes, in the County of York, to Barnard Castle, in the County of Durham, and from thence through Staindrop to Newgate in Bishop Auckland, and from Newgate, along Gibb Chair, to Gaundless Bridge, and from thence by Melderston Gill, otherwise Cowndon Gill, to the Turnpike Road near Sunderland Bridge, in the County of Durham; and for reducing the said Acts into One, and for the more effectually repairing and keeping in Repair the said Road.}}

| {{|Yorkshire Roads Act 1792|public|136|30-04-1792|repealed=y|archived=n|An Act for continuing the Term and enlarging the Powers of two Acts passed in the Seventeenth Year of the Reign of His late Majesty King George the Second, and the Fourth Year of the Reign of His present Majesty, for repairing the Road between the Town of Kingston-upon-Hull and the Town of Beverley, in the East Riding of the County of York; and for repairing the Road from Newland Bridge to the West End of the Town of Cottingham, in the said Riding.}}

| {{|Wiltshire and Somerset Roads Act 1792|public|137|30-04-1792|repealed=y|archived=n|An Act for making, amending, and keeping in Repair a Road from the Bottom of Mason's Lane, near the Town of Bradford, in the County of Wilts, to join the Turnpike Road leading from the City of Bath to Kingsdown, at or near Bathford Bridge, in the County of Somerset.}}

| {{|Sussex Roads Act 1792|public|138|08-05-1792|repealed=y|archived=n|An Act to enlarge the Term and Powers of an Act passed in the Eleventh Year of the Reign of His present Majesty King George the Third, for repairing and widening the Road from Hodges to Beadles Hill, and from thence to the Town of Cuckfield, and from Beadles Hill aforesaid, to the Town of Lindfield, and from the Turnpike Road between Cuckfield and Crawley, to the Town of Horsham, and also the Road from Swingate, in the Parish of Burwash, to Shover Green, in the Parish of Ticehurst, all in the County of Sussex.}}

| {{|Lancaster Roads Act 1792|public|139|08-05-1792|repealed=y|archived=n|An Act for making and maintaining a Road from or nearly from Stand Ege, within Saddleworth, in the West Riding of the County of York, to or near Mump's Brook, in the Township of Oldham, in the Parish of Prestwich, in the County Palatine of Lancaster, and also a Road leading out of the said intended Road through or near Dobcross, to or near a Place called Wall Hill in Saddleworth aforesaid; and also another Road leading out of the said first-mentioned Road at or near a Place called Shaw Hall, to or near a Place called Hollins, all in Saddleworth aforesaid.}}

| {{|Worcester and Warwick Roads Act 1792|public|140|08-05-1792|repealed=y|archived=n|An Act for enlarging the Term and Powers of two Acts passed in the Twenty-sixth Year of the Reign of King George the Second, and the Thirteenth Year of the Reign of His present Majesty, for repairing the Road leading from the Market House in Stourbridge, and other Roads therein mentioned, in the Counties of Worcester, Stafford, Salop, and Warwick respectively, so far as the said Acts relate to the repairing of the Road from Blakedown Pool, in the Parish of Hagley and County of Worcester, to the Top of Smallbrooke Street, and from the Five Ways to Easy Row, in Birmingham, in the said County of Warwick.}}

| {{|Warminster Roads Act 1792|public|141|11-06-1792|repealed=y|archived=n|An Act for enlarging the Term and Powers of an Act of the Fifth Year of His present Majesty, for repairing several Roads leading from the Town of Warminster, in the County of Wilts; and for amending several other Roads in or near the said Town; for repairing several Roads in and leading through the Town of Warminster; for paving and repairing the Footways, and regulating the Market, within the said Town of Warminster.}}

| {{|Collingham to York Road Act 1792|public|142|11-06-1792|repealed=y|archived=n|An Act for enlarging the Term and Powers of an Act passed in the Eleventh Year of the Reign of His present Majesty for repairing and widening the Road from Collingham, through Wetherby, to the City of York.}}

| {{|Salop Roads Act 1792|public|143|11-06-1792|repealed=y|archived=n|An Act for continuing the Term and altering and enlarging the Powers of an Act of the Twelfth Year of His present Majesty, for repairing, widening, and keeping in Repair the Road from Burlton, in the County of Salop through Knockin to Llanymynech, in the same County, and from Knockin to the East End of the Llanriader Road, and from Place Carrick Lane, to the Turnpike Road from Llanymynech to Oswestry near Coid Issa Mountain, and from Oswestry Turnpike Road on Knockin Heath to the East End of Knockin Lane.}}

| {{|Devon Dorset and Somerset Roads Act 1792|public|144|11-06-1792|repealed=y|archived=n|An Act for more effectually amending, widening, and keeping in Repair the Road from Penn Inn, in the County of Dorset, to or near Shipley Lane, in the Parish of Honiton, in the County of Devon, and from Northcote Lane in Honiton aforesaid, to or near Collumpton, in the said County of Devon; and several other Roads in the Counties of Dorset, Devon, and Somerset; and for repealing so much of an Act passed in the Thirty-first Year of the Reign of King George the Second, intituled, "An Act for repairing and widening several Roads in the Counties of Dorset and Devon, leading to and through the Borough of Lyme Regis," as relates to the Road from Fair Mile Inn to Straightway Head, otherwise Stretwood Head, in the Parish of Whimple, in the said County of Devon.}}

| {{|Northumberland and Durham Roads Act 1792|public|145|11-06-1792|repealed=y|archived=n|An Act for repairing and improving the Road leading from Cornhill Burn, by Pallinsburn and Flodden Lane, to Milfield March Burn, and by Ford Bridge to Lowick; and also several other Roads therein mentioned, all in the Counties of Northumberland and Durham.}}

| {{|Gloucester Roads Act 1792|public|146|11-06-1792|repealed=y|archived=n|An Act for amending, widening, altering, and repairing the Roads from Swell Wold, in the Parish of Lower Swell, in the County of Gloucester, to or near the Sixth Mile Stone in the Turnpike Road leading from the Borough of Tewkesbury to the Town of Stow, in the same County, and from the North East End of the Swan Lane, in the Parish of Cheltenham, in the same County, to the Turnpike Road leading to Evesham, in the Parish of Sedgeborough, in the County of Worcester, and from the Town of Winchcomb, in the said County of Gloucester, by a Place called Stamp Cross, to or near the Tenth Mile Stone on the said Turnpike Road leading from Tewkesbury to Stow aforesaid.}}

| {{|Sussex Roads Act 1792|public|147|11-06-1792|repealed=y|archived=n|An Act to enlarge the Term and alter and amend the Powers of Two several Acts, passed in the Thirty-second Year of the Reign of King George the Second, and the Twentieth Year of the Reign of His present Majesty, for repairing the Road from the South End of the South Street, in the Parish of South Malling, near the Town of Lewes, to Glynd Bridge, and from thence through Firle Street, under the Hill, to Longbridge, in the Parish of Alfriston, in the County of Sussex; (except so far as the said Acts relate to that Part of the said Road which lies between a Place commonly called Bopeep, in the Parish of Alciston, and Longbridge aforesaid;) and for amending and keeping in Repair several other Roads therein mentioned, in the said County of Sussex.}}

| {{|Norfolk Roads Act 1792|public|148|11-06-1792|repealed=y|archived=n|An Act for repairing and improving the Road leading from the Town of Bury Saint Edmunds, in the County of Suffolk, to and through the Town of Thetford, in the Counties of Norfolk and Suffolk to the present Turnpike Road leading from Lynn, through the Parish of Cranwich, in the said County of Norfolk.}}

| {{|Berwick Roads Act 1792|public|149|11-06-1792|repealed=y|archived=n|An Act for repealing an Act of the Twelfth Year of His present Majesty, intituled, "An Act for repairing and widening the Roads from the Confines of the County of Berwick, at or near Banghouse Walls, to Compton's Lanes and Eymouth, and from the Town of Eccles to Eymouth, and from Whitelaw Muir to Compton's Lanes, in the County of Berwick; and for repairing, widening, and amending several Roads, and for regulating the Statute Labour, in the said County of Berwick."}}

| {{|Great Farringdon to Burford Road Act 1792|public|150|11-06-1792|repealed=y|archived=n|An Act for enlarging the Term and Powers of an Act passed in the Eleventh Year of the Reign of His present Majesty, for repairing, widening, turning, and altering the Road from the Market House in the Town of Great Farringdon, in the County of Berks, to Burford, in the County of Oxford.}}

| {{|Kent and Surrey Roads Act 1792|public|151|11-06-1792|repealed=y|archived=n|An Act for enlarging the Term and Powers of an Act passed in the Tenth Year of the Reign of His present Majesty, for repairing, widening, and keeping in Repair the Road leading from the Eaton Bridge Turnpike Road at Cockham Hill, in the Parish of Westerham, in the County of Kent, through the Village of Limpsfield, to the Village of Titsey, over Botley Hill, Worms Heath, and Wallingham Common, to the Turnpike Road leading from Croydon to Godstone, in the County of Surrey.}}

| {{|Glasgow Roads Act 1792|public|152|11-06-1792|repealed=y|archived=n|An Act for enlarging the Term and Powers of an Act made in the Fourteenth Year of the Reign of His present Majesty, intituled, "An Act to continue the Term of Two Acts, made in the Twenty-sixth and Twenty-seventh Years of the Reign of His late Majesty King George the Second, for repairing several Roads leading into the City of Glasgow, so far as the same relate to the Roads from the City of Glasgow to Yoker Bridge, to Renfrew Bridge, to the Three Mile House, to the Town of Airdrie, and from the Village of Gorbals to the Chapel of Cambuslang, in the Counties of Lanerk and Renfrew," so far as the said Act relates to the Road from the City of Glasgow to Yoker Bridge; and for more effectually making, widening, repairing, and keeping in Repair the said Road, and the Road of Communication between the said Road from Glasgow to Yoker Bridge, and the Canal from the Forth to the Clyde.}}

| {{|Gloucester and Wiltshire Roads Act 1792|public|153|11-06-1792|repealed=y|archived=n|An Act for repairing, widening, turning, and altering the Road leading from the Town of Burford, in the County of Oxford, to Leachlade, in the County of Gloucester, and for making a Road from thence to the River Isis or Thames; for building a Bridge across the said River, and for making a Road from thence to join the present Road leading from Leachlade to Inglesham; and for repairing, widening, turning, and altering the said last mentioned Road, to and through the Town of Highworth, in the County of Wilts, to the present Turnpike Road leading from Cricklade to Swindon, in the same County.}}

| {{|Glasgow Roads Act 1792|public|154|11-06-1792|repealed=y|archived=n|An Act for altering and enlarging the Powers of an Act passed in the Thirty-first Year of the Reign of His present Majesty, for repairing the Roads from Livingston, by the Kirk of Shotts, to the City of Glasgow, and other Roads therein mentioned; and for building a Bridge over the River Clyde, at or near Theevesford, and for opening and making certain Streets, in and near the City of Glasgow; for altering a Part of the High Road betwixt Edinburgh and Glasgow, by carrying a new Line of Road to the North of the Hills, and another Line of Road by the South, and for straightening and making the Roads more convenient: as also for altering the Road from the City of Glasgow to the Town of Hamilton, and for building a Bridge over the River Clyde below the present old Bridge, called Bothwell Bridge; as also for altering the Road from the Town of Hamilton Eastward, until it joins the Great Road between Edinburgh and Glasgow.}}

| {{|York Roads Act 1792|public|155|11-06-1792|repealed=y|archived=n|An Act for continuing the Term and enlarging the Powers of two Acts passed in the Eighteenth Year of the Reign of His late Majesty King George the Second, and the Eleventh Year of the Reign of His present Majesty, for repairing the Road leading from Tadcaster Bridge, within the County of the City of York, to a Place near the said City called Hobmoor Lane End.}}

| {{|Carmarthen Roads Act 1792|public|156|11-06-1792|repealed=y|archived=n|An Act for repairing, altering, and improving the Road from Golden Grove Park, in the Parish of Llandilofawr, to the Turnpike Road leading from the New Bridge over the River Towy to the Lime Kilns in the Parish of Llandarog, and also several other Roads therein mentioned, all in the County of Carmarthen.}}

| {{|Stafford Roads Act 1792|public|157|11-06-1792|repealed=y|archived=n|An Act for repealing an Act passed in the Eleventh Year of the Reign of His present Majesty, for repairing and widening the Road from Stone to Lane End, and to the Road between Leek and Sandon, on Meir Heath, and from Meir to Trentham, and from thence to Stableford, in the County of Stafford, and for granting other Powers for those Purposes; and for repairing and improving the Road from a Place called Walton, in Stone aforesaid, to Eccleshall, in the said County of Stafford.}}

| {{|Norfolk Roads Act 1792|public|158|11-06-1792|repealed=y|archived=n|An Act for continuing the Term, and altering and enlarging the Powers of an Act passed in the Twelfth Year of the Reign of His present Majesty, for repairing and widening the Road leading from the East End of the Bridge across the River Ouze in Downham Market, to the Queen's Head, and from the Chequer Inn, in Downham Market aforesaid, to the East End of The Two Mile Close, in the Parish of Barton, and towards Watton to a Place called The Devil's Ditch, in the County of Norfolk; and for stopping up the Road leading from Stradset, through Barton Layes, towards Watton.}}

| {{|Dunstable to Hockliffe Road Act 1792|public|159|15-06-1792|repealed=y|archived=n|An Act for amending and more effectually repairing the Road from the Black Bull Inn, in Dunstable, in the County of Bedford, to the King's Arms, in Hockliffe, in the said County.}}

| {{|Stafford Roads Act 1792|public|160|15-06-1792|repealed=y|archived=n|An Act to continue the Term, and alter and enlarge the Powers of an Act, passed in the Eleventh Year of the Reign of His present Majesty, for repairing and widening the Road from Shelton, to the Road between Cheadle and Leek, and from Bucknall to Weston Coyney, and from the Road between Cheadle and Leek, to the Turnpike Road above Frogall Bridge, and from the same Road to the Road between Blyth Marsh and Thorp, at or near Ruchill Gate, in the County of Stafford, so far as the same relates to the Road from Shelton to Blakeley Lane Head, and from Bucknall to Weston Coyney.}}

}}

Private and personal acts

| {{|Avebury (Wiltshire) allotment of open and common lands and grounds.|private|2|31-01-1792|note3=|repealed=n|archived=n|}}

| {{|Croscombe and Dinder (Somerset) inclosure.|private|3|31-01-1792|note3=|repealed=n|archived=n|}}

| {{|Gilbert Beckett: change of name and arms to Turner.|private|4|31-01-1792|note3=|repealed=n|archived=n|}}

| {{|Naturalization of Richard Walker.|private|5|31-01-1792|note3=|repealed=n|archived=n|}}

| {{|Naturalization of John Doxat and Charles Brandt.|private|6|31-01-1792|note3=|repealed=n|archived=n|}}

| {{|Naturalization of John Gourgas and James Soret.|private|7|31-01-1792|note3=|repealed=n|archived=n|}}

| {{|Naturalization of John Hentig and Jacob Anderson.|private|8|31-01-1792|note3=|repealed=n|archived=n|}}

| {{|Naturalization of Herman Schroder.|private|9|31-01-1792|note3=|repealed=n|archived=n|}}

| {{|Ralph Carr's estate: felling of timber and investment of proceeds in lands and hereditaments to be settled to the uses of his will, and also other provisions.|private|10|31-01-1792|note3=|repealed=n|archived=n|}}

| {{|Walton-on-the-Wolds (Leicestershire) inclosure.|private|11|31-01-1792|note3=|repealed=n|archived=n|}}

| {{|Balliol College Oxford and City of London estates: vesting of property in St. Lawrence Jewry in the City, and securing to Balliol yearly rents in lieu.|private|12|31-01-1792|note3=|repealed=n|archived=n|}}

| {{|William Raybould's divorce from Joannah Pearsall, and other provisions.|private|13|31-01-1792|note3=|repealed=n|archived=n|}}

| {{|John Larking's divorce from Elizabeth Marcon.|private|14|31-01-1792|note3=|repealed=n|archived=n|}}

| {{|John Wilmot's divorce from Fanny Sainthill, and other provisions.|private|15|31-01-1792|note3=|repealed=n|archived=n|}}

| {{|Knooke (Wiltshire) allotments.|private|16|31-01-1792|note3=|repealed=n|archived=n|}}

| {{|North Grimston (Yorkshire, East Riding) inclosure.|private|17|31-01-1792|note3=|repealed=n|archived=n|}}

| {{|Redmile (Leicestershire) inclosure.|private|18|31-01-1792|note3=|repealed=n|archived=n|}}

| {{|Wood Enderby (Lincolnshire) inclosure.|private|19|31-01-1792|note3=|repealed=n|archived=n|}}

| {{|Broadwell (Gloucestershire) inclosure.|private|20|31-01-1792|note3=|repealed=n|archived=n|}}

| {{|Turkdean (Gloucestershire) inclosure.|private|21|31-01-1792|note3=|repealed=n|archived=n|}}

| {{|Aynho (Northamptonshire) inclosure.|private|22|31-01-1792|note3=|repealed=n|archived=n|}}

| {{|Reedsdale and Corsendide (Northumberland) inclosure.|private|23|31-01-1792|note3=|repealed=n|archived=n|}}

| {{|John Blackburne's estate: vesting a leasehold estate in trustees, to be sold.|private|24|31-01-1792|note3=|repealed=n|archived=n|}}

| {{|Tydd St. Mary (Lincolnshire) inclosure.|private|25|31-01-1792|note3=|repealed=n|archived=n|}}

| {{|Ogbourne St. George (Wiltshire) allotment of lands.|private|26|31-01-1792|note3=|repealed=n|archived=n|}}

| {{|Francis Foljambe's, Earl Fitzwilliam's and Lord Hawke's estates: exchanges.|private|27|31-01-1792|note3=|repealed=n|archived=n|}}

| {{|Edward Baron de Clifford's estate: discharging estates in Spring Garden, Middlesex, from pin money, jointure and portions.|private|28|31-01-1792|note3=|repealed=n|archived=n|}}

| {{|Sir Alexander Murray's estate: vesting estates at Melgund and Kynnyndmond and others in trustees, to be sold, and purchase of other lands to be settled in lieu.|private|29|31-01-1792|note3=|repealed=n|archived=n|}}

| {{|Bristol Cathedral estate: enabling grant of building leases.|private|30|31-01-1792|note3=|repealed=n|archived=n|}}

| {{|John Trehawke's estate: vesting in trustees.|private|31|31-01-1792|note3=|repealed=n|archived=n|}}

| {{|St. Mary Islington (Middlesex): enabling the vicar to grant building leases of glebe lands.|private|32|31-01-1792|note3=|repealed=n|archived=n|}}

| {{|Reverend John Taylor and Harry Elderton: confirming and executing an agreement for the grant of a building lease of ground belonging to Clifton Curacy (Gloucestershire).|private|33|31-01-1792|note3=|repealed=n|archived=n|}}

| {{|Philip Goldsworthy's estate: power to grant building or repairing leases.|private|34|31-01-1792|note3=|repealed=n|archived=n|}}

| {{|Henry and Ann Tonge's marriage settlement: enabling trustees to sell property and purchase Old South Sea annuities in lieu.|private|35|31-01-1792|note3=|repealed=n|archived=n|}}

| {{|Thomas and Henrietta Griffith's estate:|note1= vesting estates in Cuddington (Cheshire), Llanvilling and Penant (Montgomeryshire) in Sir Richard Brooke as mortgagee in fee simple, vesting the equity of redemption in Thomas Griffith and settling an estate in Mold (Flintshire) in lieu.|private|36|31-01-1792|note3=|repealed=n|archived=n|}}

| {{|Edward Curtis's estate: power to grant building leases over ground at Clifton (Gloucestershire).|private|37|31-01-1792|note3=|repealed=n|archived=n|}}

| {{|Edward and Catherine Daniel's estate: vesting property in Clifton (Bristol) in trustees, to be sold, and purchase of other lands to be settled in lieu.|private|38|31-01-1792|note3=|repealed=n|archived=n|}}

| {{|Charles Churchill's estate:|note1= enabling heirs of his surviving trustees to sell property in Chalfont Saint Peter's and Iver (Buckinghamshire) purchased by virtue of an Act of 23 Geo. 2 (23 Geo. 2 c. 18), the consideration to be paid to his personal trustees to be invested in other lands to be settled to the uses and with the limitations in the said Act, and to sell those lands and any others purchased under the said Act, and to invest the purchase money in public funds, securities or other lands.|private|39|31-01-1792|note3=|repealed=n|archived=n|}}

| {{|Colin Campbell's estate (Blythswood (Lanarkshire and Renfrewshire)):|note1= vesting parts of Blythswood, and other estates, in Lanarkshire, in trustees to be sold or feued, and investing the proceeds in the purchase of more convenient estates, to be settled according to the deed of entail made by Colin Campbell.|private|40|31-01-1792|note3=|repealed=n|archived=n|}}
}}

1793 (33 Geo. 3)

The third session of the 17th Parliament of Great Britain, which met from 13 December 1792 until 21 June 1793.

See:

Public acts

| {{|Exportation Act 1793|public|2|13-12-1792|note3=|repealed=y|archived=n|}}

| {{|Exportation (No. 2) Act 1793|public|3|13-12-1792|note3=|repealed=y|archived=n|}}

| {{|Aliens Act 1793|public|4|13-12-1792|note3=|repealed=y|archived=n|}}

| {{|Debtors Relief Act 1793|public|5|13-12-1792|note3=|repealed=y|archived=n|}}

| {{|Marine Mutiny Act 1793|public|6|13-12-1792|note3=|repealed=y|archived=n|}}

| {{|Land Tax Act 1793|public|7|13-12-1792|note3=|repealed=y|archived=n|}}

| {{|Families of Militiamen Act 1793|public|8|13-12-1792|note3=|repealed=y|archived=n|}}

| {{|Mutiny Act 1793|public|9|13-12-1792|note3=|repealed=y|archived=n|}}

| {{|Trade with America Act 1793|public|10|13-12-1792|note3=|repealed=y|archived=n|}}

| {{|Malt Duties Act 1793|public|11|13-12-1792|note3=|repealed=y|archived=n|}}

| {{|Indemnity Act 1793|public|12|13-12-1792|note3=|repealed=y|archived=n|}}

| {{|Acts of Parliament (Commencement) Act 1793|public|13|13-12-1792|note3=|repealed=y|archived=n|}}

| {{|Royal Exchange Assurance Act 1793|public|14|13-12-1792|note3=|repealed=y|archived=n|}}

| {{|Bank of England Site Act 1793|public|15|13-12-1792|note3=|repealed=y|archived=n|}}

| {{|Basingstoke Canal Act 1793|public|16|13-12-1792|note3=|repealed=y|archived=n|}}

| {{|Loans or Exchequer Bill Act 1793|public|17|13-12-1792|note3=|repealed=y|archived=n|}}

| {{|Loans or Exchequer Bill (No. 2) Act 1793|public|18|13-12-1792|note3=|repealed=y|archived=n|}}

| {{|Militia Pay Act 1793|public|19|13-12-1792|note3=|repealed=y|archived=n|}}

| {{|Ipswich and Stowmarket Navigation Act 1793|public|20|13-12-1792|note3=|repealed=y|archived=n|}}

| {{|Manchester and Stockport Canal Act 1793|public|21|13-12-1792|note3=|repealed=y|archived=n|}}

| {{|Reduction of National Debt Act 1793|public|22|13-12-1792|note3=|repealed=y|archived=n|}}

| {{|Table Beer Act 1793|public|23|13-12-1792|note3=|repealed=y|archived=n|}}

| {{|Chorley and Rufford Chapels, Lancaster Act 1793|public|24|13-12-1792|note3=|repealed=y|archived=n|}}

| {{|Ludlow, Salop: Improvement Act 1793|public|25|13-12-1792|note3=|repealed=y|archived=n|}}

| {{|Supply of Seamen Act 1793|public|26|13-12-1792|note3=|repealed=y|archived=n|}}

| {{|Correspondence with Enemies Act 1793|public|27|13-12-1792|note3=|repealed=y|archived=n|}}

| {{|National Debt Act 1793|public|28|13-12-1792|note3=|repealed=y|archived=n|}}

| {{|Exchequer Bills Act 1793|public|29|13-12-1792|note3=|repealed=y|archived=n|}}

| {{|Forgeries and Frauds in Bank Transfers Act 1793|public|30|13-12-1792|note3=|repealed=y|archived=n|}}

| {{|Liverpool Note Issue Act 1793|public|31|13-12-1792|note3=|repealed=y|archived=n|}}

| {{|National Debt (No. 2) Act 1793|public|32|13-12-1792|note3=|repealed=y|archived=n|}}

| {{|Salt Act 1793|public|33|13-12-1792|note3=|repealed=y|archived=n|}}

| {{|Prize Act 1793|public|34|13-12-1792|note3=|repealed=y|archived=n|}}

| {{|Poor Act 1793|public|35|13-12-1792|note3=|repealed=y|archived=n|}}

| {{|Fencibles Act 1793|public|36|13-12-1792|note3=|repealed=y|archived=n|}}

| {{|Bread Act 1793|public|37|13-12-1792|note3=|repealed=y|archived=n|}}

| {{|Warwick and Birmingham Canal Act 1793|note1=|public|38|13-12-1792|note3=|repealed=y|archived=n|}}

| {{|Hemlingford Riots Act 1793|public|39|13-12-1792|note3=|repealed=y|archived=n|}}

| {{|Continuance of Laws Act 1793|public|40|13-12-1792|note3=|repealed=y|archived=n|}}

| {{|Restoration of Robert Claxton Act 1793|public|41|13-12-1792|note3=|repealed=y|archived=n|}}

| {{|Free Fishers of Whitstable Act 1793|public|42|13-12-1792|note3=|repealed=y|archived=n|}}

| {{|Paddington Parish Church Act 1793|public|43|13-12-1792|note3=|repealed=y|archived=n|}}

| {{|Roman Catholics Act 1793|public|44|13-12-1792|note3=|repealed=y|archived=n|}}

| {{|Crown Lands, Forfeited Estates in Ireland Act 1793|public|46|13-12-1792|note3=|repealed=y|archived=n|}}

| {{|Hanbury Church Act 1793|public|45|13-12-1792|note3=|repealed=y|archived=n|}}

| {{|East India Company (Money) Act 1793|note1=(Sometimes called the East India Company (Stock) Act 1793)|public|47|13-12-1792|note3=|repealed=y|archived=n|}}

| {{|Customs Act 1793|public|48|13-12-1792|note3=|repealed=y|archived=n|}}

| {{|British Sailcloth, etc. Act 1793|public|49|13-12-1792|note3=|repealed=y|archived=n|}}

| {{|Importation and Exportation Act 1793|public|50|13-12-1792|note3=|repealed=y|archived=n|}}

| {{|Amendment of c. 29 of this Session Act 1793|public|51|13-12-1792|note3=|repealed=y|archived=n|}}

| {{|East India Company Act 1793|public|52|13-12-1792|note3=|repealed=y|archived=n|}}

| {{|Pawnbrokers Act 1793|public|53|13-12-1792|note3=|repealed=y|archived=n|}}

| {{|Friendly Societies Act 1793|public|54|13-12-1792|note3=|repealed=y|archived=n|}}

| {{|Parish Officers Act 1793|note1=|public|55|13-12-1792|note3=|repealed=y|archived=n|}}

| {{|Sugar Act 1793|public|56|13-12-1792|note3=|repealed=y|archived=n|}}

| {{|Warehoused Tobacco, etc. Act 1793|public|57|13-12-1792|note3=|repealed=y|archived=n|}}

| {{|Southern Whale Fishery Act 1793|public|58|13-12-1792|note3=|repealed=y|archived=n|}}

| {{|Excise Act 1793|public|59|13-12-1792|note3=|repealed=y|archived=n|}}

| {{|Mail to Spain Act 1793|public|60|13-12-1792|note3=|repealed=y|archived=n|}}

| {{|Distilleries, etc. (Scotland) Act 1793|public|61|13-12-1792|note3=|repealed=y|archived=n|}}

| {{|Lottery Act 1793|public|62|13-12-1792|note3=|repealed=y|archived=n|}}

| {{|Importation Act 1793|public|63|13-12-1792|note3=|repealed=y|archived=n|}}

| {{|Parliamentary Elections Act 1793|note1=|public|64|13-12-1792|note3=|repealed=y|archived=n|}}

| {{|Importation and Exportation (No. 2) Act 1793|public|65|13-12-1792|note3=|repealed=y|archived=n|}}

| {{|Manning of the Navy, etc. Act 1793|public|66|13-12-1792|note3=|repealed=y|archived=n|}}

| {{|Shipping Offences Act 1793|note1=|public|67|13-12-1792|note3=|repealed=y|archived=n|}}

| {{|Wales, Chester, etc. (Courts) Act 1793|public|68|13-12-1792|note3=|repealed=y|archived=n|}}

| {{|Excise (Scotland) Act 1793|public|69|13-12-1792|note3=|repealed=y|archived=n|}}

| {{|Customs (No. 2) Act 1793|public|70|13-12-1792|note3=|repealed=y|archived=n|}}

| {{|Post Horse Duties Act 1793|public|71|13-12-1792|note3=|repealed=y|archived=n|}}

| {{|Appropriation Act 1793|public|72|13-12-1792|note3=|repealed=y|archived=n|}}

| {{|Slave Trade Act 1793|public|73|13-12-1792|note3=|repealed=y|archived=n|}}

| {{|Payment of Creditors (Scotland) Act 1793|public|74|13-12-1792|note3=|repealed=y|archived=n|}}

| {{|London (Streets and Sewers) Act 1793|public|75|13-12-1792|note3=|repealed=y|archived=n|}}

| {{|Courts, Newfoundland Act 1793|public|76|13-12-1792|note3=|repealed=y|archived=n|}}

| {{|Annuity (Lord Rodney) Act 1793|public|77|13-12-1792|note3=|repealed=y|archived=n|}}

| {{|Cornwall Duchy Act 1793|public|78|13-12-1792|note3=|repealed=y|archived=n|}}

| {{|Militia, Sussex Act 1793|public|79|13-12-1792|note3=|repealed=y|archived=n|}}

| {{|Grand Junction Canal Act 1793|note1=|public|80|13-12-1792|note3=|repealed=y|archived=n|}}

| {{|Customs (No. 3) Act 1793|public|81|13-12-1792|note3=|repealed=y|archived=n|}}

| {{|Whitechapel, Stepney: Improvement Act 1793|public|82|13-12-1792|note3=|repealed=y|archived=n|}}

| {{|Saint Luke, Old Street: Improvement Act 1793|public|83|13-12-1792|note3=|repealed=y|archived=n|}}

| {{|West Riding: Small Debts Act 1793|public|84|13-12-1792|note3=|repealed=y|archived=n|}}

| {{|Plymouth Water Supply Act 1793|public|85|13-12-1792|note3=|repealed=y|archived=n|}}

| {{|Leeds Coal Supply Act 1793|public|86|13-12-1792|note3=|repealed=y|archived=n|}}

| {{|Saint Mary, Islington, Church Act 1793|public|87|13-12-1792|note3=|repealed=y|archived=n|}}

| {{|Bethnal Green and Shoreditch: Improvement Act 1793|public|88|13-12-1792|note3=|repealed=y|archived=n|}}

| {{|Walcot, Somerset: Improvement Act 1793|public|89|13-12-1792|note3=|repealed=y|archived=n|}}

| {{|Christchurch, Surrey, Streets Act 1793|public|90|13-12-1792|note3=|repealed=y|archived=n|}}

| {{|Ellesmere and Chester Canal Act 1793|public|91|13-12-1792|note3=|repealed=y|archived=n|}}

| {{|Ipswich: Improvement Act 1793|public|92|13-12-1792|note3=|repealed=y|archived=n|}}

| {{|Chelmsford and Blackwater Canal Act 1793|public|93|13-12-1792|note3=|repealed=y|archived=n|}}

| {{|Grantham Canal Act 1793|public|94|13-12-1792|note3=|repealed=y|archived=n|}}

| {{|Aberdare Canal Act 1793|public|95|13-12-1792|note3=|repealed=y|archived=n|}}

| {{|Brecknock and Abergavenny Canal Act 1793|public|96|13-12-1792|note3=|repealed=y|archived=n|}}

| {{|Gloucester and Berkeley Canal Act 1793|public|97|13-12-1792|note3=|repealed=y|archived=n|}}

| {{|Leicestershire and Northamptonshire Union Canal Act 1793|note1=|public|98|13-12-1792|note3=|repealed=y|archived=n|}}

| {{|Foss, York: Navigation Act 1793|public|99|13-12-1792|note3=|repealed=y|archived=n|}}

| {{|Littlehampton Harbour Act 1793|public|100|13-12-1792|note3=|repealed=y|archived=n|}}

| {{|All Saints' Church, Southampton Act 1793|public|101|13-12-1792|note3=|repealed=y|archived=n|}}

| {{|Derby Canal Act 1793|public|102|13-12-1792|note3=|repealed=y|archived=n|}}

| {{|Oakham Canal Act 1793|public|103|13-12-1792|note3=|repealed=y|archived=n|}}

| {{|Crinan Canal Act 1793|public|104|13-12-1792|note3=|repealed=y|archived=n|}}

| {{|Ulverstone Canal Act 1793|public|105|13-12-1792|note3=|repealed=y|archived=n|}}

| {{|Bubwith Bridge Act 1793|public|106|13-12-1792|note3=|repealed=y|archived=n|}}

| {{|Lancaster Canal Act 1793|public|107|13-12-1792|note3=|repealed=y|archived=n|}}

| {{|Whitgift, Yorkshire (Drainage) Act 1793|public|108|13-12-1792|note3=|repealed=y|archived=n|}}

| {{|South Holland: Drainage Act 1793|public|109|13-12-1792|note3=|repealed=y|archived=n|}}

| {{|Barnsley Canal Act 1793|public|110|13-12-1792|note3=|repealed=y|archived=n|}}

| {{|Shipley Canal Act 1793|public|111|13-12-1792|note3=|repealed=y|archived=n|}}

| {{|Stratford-upon-Avon Canal Act 1793|public|112|13-12-1792|note3=|repealed=y|archived=n|}}

| {{|Shrewsbury Canal Act 1793|public|113|13-12-1792|note3=|repealed=y|archived=n|}}

| {{|South Kelsey to Caistor Canal Act 1793|public|114|13-12-1792|note3=|repealed=y|archived=n|}}

| {{|Barnsley Canal (No. 2) Act 1793|public|115|13-12-1792|note3=|repealed=y|archived=n|}}

| {{|Lincoln: Drainage Act 1793|public|116|13-12-1792|note3=|repealed=y|archived=n|}}

| {{|Stainforth and Keadby Canal Act 1793|public|117|13-12-1792|note3=|repealed=y|archived=n|}}

| {{|Inverness Roads Act 1793|public|118|13-12-1792|note3=|repealed=y|archived=n|}}

| {{|Herefordshire and Gloucestershire Canal Act 1793|public|119|13-12-1792|note3=|repealed=y|archived=n|}}

| {{|Caithness Roads Act 1793|public|120|13-12-1792|note3=|repealed=y|archived=n|}}

| {{|Selly Oak Canal Act 1793|public|121|13-12-1792|note3=|repealed=y|archived=n|}}

| {{|Trevaunance Harbour Act 1793|public|122|13-12-1792|note3=|repealed=y|archived=n|}}

| {{|Carnarvon Harbour Act 1793|public|123|13-12-1792|note3=|repealed=y|archived=n|}}

| {{|Glasgow: Improvement Act 1793|public|124|13-12-1792|note3=|repealed=y|archived=n|}}

| {{|Amlwch Harbour Act 1793|public|125|13-12-1792|note3=|repealed=y|archived=n|}}

| {{|Blything, Suffolk (Poor Relief, Guardians, etc.) Act 1793|public|126|13-12-1792|note3=|repealed=y|archived=n|}}

| {{|Private (Bedford Charities) Act 1793|public|127|13-12-1792|note3=|repealed=y|archived=n|}}

| {{|Ipswich and Yaxley Roads Act 1793|public|128|13-12-1792|note3=|repealed=y|archived=n|}}

| {{|Wakefield and Halifax Roads Act 1793|public|129|13-12-1792|note3=|repealed=y|archived=n|}}

| {{|Cambridge to Royston Road Act 1793|public|130|13-12-1792|note3=|repealed=y|archived=n|}}

| {{|Uttoxeter to Stoke Road Act 1793|public|131|13-12-1792|note3=|repealed=y|archived=n|}}

| {{|Ledbury Roads Act 1793|public|132|13-12-1792|note3=|repealed=y|archived=n|}}

| {{|Glamorgan Roads Act 1793|public|133|13-12-1792|note3=|repealed=y|archived=n|}}

| {{|Blackburn to Burscough Bridge Road Act 1793|public|134|13-12-1792|note3=|repealed=y|archived=n|}}

| {{|Hampton to Staines Road Act 1793|public|135|13-12-1792|note3=|repealed=y|archived=n|}}

| {{|Bawtry to Markham Road Act 1793|public|136|13-12-1792|note3=|repealed=y|archived=n|}}

| {{|Witney to Chanfield Road Act 1793|public|137|13-12-1792|note3=|repealed=y|archived=n|}}

| {{|Berkshire and Wiltshire Roads Act 1793|public|138|13-12-1792|note3=|repealed=y|archived=n|}}

| {{|Manchester to Chester Roads Act 1793|public|139|13-12-1792|note3=|repealed=y|archived=n|}}

| {{|Yorkshire Derby and Chester Roads Act 1793|public|140|13-12-1792|note3=|repealed=y|archived=n|}}

| {{|Stafford Roads Act 1793|public|141|13-12-1792|note3=|repealed=y|archived=n|}}

| {{|Halifax to Sheffield Road Act 1793|public|142|13-12-1792|note3=|repealed=y|archived=n|}}

| {{|Little Bowden to Rockingham Road Act 1793|public|143|13-12-1792|note3=|repealed=y|archived=n|}}

| {{|Bath Roads Act 1793|public|144|13-12-1792|note3=|repealed=y|archived=n|}}

| {{|Essex Roads Act 1793|public|145|13-12-1792|note3=|repealed=y|archived=n|}}

| {{|Cockerton Bridge to Staindrop Road Act 1793|public|146|13-12-1792|note3=|repealed=y|archived=n|}}

| {{|Wolverhampton Roads Act 1793|public|147|13-12-1792|note3=|repealed=y|archived=n|}}

| {{|Durham Roads Act 1793|public|148|13-12-1792|note3=|repealed=y|archived=n|}}

| {{|Essex Roads (No. 2) Act 1793|public|149|13-12-1792|note3=|repealed=y|archived=n|}}

| {{|Lincoln Roads Act 1793|public|150|13-12-1792|note3=|repealed=y|archived=n|}}

| {{|St. Neots to Cambridge Road Act 1793|public|151|13-12-1792|note3=|repealed=y|archived=n|}}

| {{|Derby Roads Act 1793|public|152|13-12-1792|note3=|repealed=y|archived=n|}}

| {{|Stafford and Salop Roads Act 1793|public|153|13-12-1792|note3=|repealed=y|archived=n|}}

| {{|Brecon Roads Act 1793|public|154|13-12-1792|note3=|repealed=y|archived=n|}}

| {{|Wiltshire and Somerset Roads Act 1793|public|155|13-12-1792|note3=|repealed=y|archived=n|}}

| {{|Godmanchester to Cambridge Road Act 1793|public|156|13-12-1792|note3=|repealed=y|archived=n|}}

| {{|Yorkshire Roads Act 1793|public|157|13-12-1792|note3=|repealed=y|archived=n|}}

| {{|Perth Roads Act 1793|public|158|13-12-1792|note3=|repealed=y|archived=n|}}

| {{|Hemingbrough to Market Weighton Road Act 1793|public|159|13-12-1792|note3=|repealed=y|archived=n|}}

| {{|Glasgow Roads Act 1793|public|160|13-12-1792|note3=|repealed=y|archived=n|}}

| {{|Durham Roads (No. 2) Act 1793|public|161|13-12-1792|note3=|repealed=y|archived=n|}}

| {{|Kent Roads Act 1793|public|162|13-12-1792|note3=|repealed=y|archived=n|}}

| {{|Haddington Roads Act 1793|public|163|13-12-1792|note3=|repealed=y|archived=n|}}

| {{|Warrington to Wigan Road Act 1793|public|164|13-12-1792|note3=|repealed=y|archived=n|}}

| {{|Somerset Roads Act 1793|public|165|13-12-1792|note3=|repealed=y|archived=n|}}

| {{|Hungerford to Leckford Road Act 1793|public|168|13-12-1792|note3=|repealed=y|archived=n|}}

| {{|Stafford Roads (No. 2) Act 1793|public|167|13-12-1792|note3=|repealed=y|archived=n|}}

| {{|Monmouth Roads Act 1793|public|169|13-12-1792|note3=|repealed=y|archived=n|}}

| {{|Bawtry by Selby Road Act 1793|public|166|13-12-1792|note3=|repealed=y|archived=n|}}

| {{|Manchester to Wilmslow Road Act 1793|public|170|13-12-1792|note3=|repealed=y|archived=n|}}

| {{|Manchester to Buxton Road Act 1793|public|171|13-12-1792|note3=|repealed=y|archived=n|}}

| {{|Salop Roads Act 1793|public|172|13-12-1792|note3=|repealed=y|archived=n|}}

| {{|Maidstone to Ashford Road Act 1793|public|173|13-12-1792|note3=|repealed=y|archived=n|}}

| {{|Glasgow Roads (No. 2) Act 1793|public|174|13-12-1792|note3=|repealed=y|archived=n|}}

| {{|Worcester Roads Act 1793|public|175|13-12-1792|note3=|repealed=y|archived=n|}}

| {{|Market Harborough to Loughborough Road Act 1793|public|176|13-12-1792|note3=|repealed=y|archived=n|}}

| {{|Heage to Duffield Road Act 1793|public|177|13-12-1792|note3=|repealed=y|archived=n|}}

| {{|Bedford Roads Act 1793|public|178|13-12-1792|note3=|repealed=y|archived=n|}}

| {{|Wakefield to Abberford Road Act 1793|public|179|13-12-1792|note3=|repealed=y|archived=n|}}

| {{|Bicester Roads Act 1793|public|180|13-12-1792|note3=|repealed=y|archived=n|}}

| {{|Lancaster Roads Act 1793|public|181|13-12-1792|note3=|repealed=y|archived=n|}}

| {{|Oldham to Alton Road Act 1793|public|182|13-12-1792|note3=|repealed=y|archived=n|}}

| {{|Kent Roads (No. 2) Act 1793|public|183|13-12-1792|note3=|repealed=y|archived=n|}}

| {{|Yorkshire and Derbyshire Roads Act 1793|public|184|13-12-1792|note3=|repealed=y|archived=n|}}

| {{|Berwick and Durham Roads Act 1793|public|185|13-12-1792|note3=|repealed=y|archived=n|}}

}}

Private and personal acts

| {{|Naturalization of Peter and Otto Hansen.|private|2|13-12-1792|note3=|repealed=n|archived=n|}}

| {{|Naturalization of John Fisher.|private|3|13-12-1792|note3=|repealed=n|archived=n|}}

| {{|Robert Ladbroke's estate: vesting estates in Warwickshire and Northamptonshire in trustees, to be sold, and purchase of others to be settled in lieu.|private|4|13-12-1792|note3=|repealed=n|archived=n|}}

| {{|Naturalization of John Vallotton.|private|5|13-12-1792|note3=|repealed=n|archived=n|}}

| {{|Risely (Bedfordshire) inclosure.|private|6|13-12-1792|note3=|repealed=n|archived=n|}}

| {{|Dunsley Moor in Whitby (Yorkshire, North Riding) inclosure.|private|7|13-12-1792|note3=|repealed=n|archived=n|}}

| {{|Dunston (Lincolnshire) inclosure.|private|8|13-12-1792|note3=|repealed=n|archived=n|}}

| {{|South Milforth and Lumby (Yorkshire, West Riding) inclosure.|private|9|13-12-1792|note3=|repealed=n|archived=n|}}

| {{|Wadenhoe (Northamptonshire) inclosure.|private|10|13-12-1792|note3=|repealed=n|archived=n|}}
}}

1794 (34 Geo. 3)

Public acts

| {{|Duties on Worts, Wash, etc. Act 1794|public|2|21-01-1794|note3=|repealed=y|archived=n|}}

| {{|Duties on Spirits, etc. Act 1794|public|3|21-01-1794|note3=|repealed=y|archived=n|}}

| {{|Duties on Spirits, etc. (No. 2) Act 1794|public|4|21-01-1794|note3=|repealed=y|archived=n|}}

| {{|Trade with America Act 1794|public|5|21-01-1794|note3=|repealed=y|archived=n|}}

| {{|Marine Mutiny Act 1794|public|6|21-01-1794|note3=|repealed=y|archived=n|}}

| {{|Malt Duties Act 1794|public|7|21-01-1794|note3=|repealed=y|archived=n|}}

| {{|Land Tax Act 1794|public|8|21-01-1794|note3=|repealed=y|archived=n|}}

| {{|Aid to Government of France Act 1794|public|9|21-01-1794|note3=|repealed=y|archived=n|}}

| {{|Stamps Act 1794|public|10|21-01-1794|note3=|repealed=y|archived=n|}}

| {{|Stamps Act 1794|public|11|21-01-1794|note3=|repealed=y|archived=n|}}

| {{|Indemnity Act 1794|public|12|21-01-1794|note3=|repealed=y|archived=n|}}

| {{|Mutiny Act 1794|public|13|21-01-1794|note3=|repealed=y|archived=n|}}

| {{|Stamps Act 1794|public|14|21-01-1794|note3=|repealed=y|archived=n|}}

| {{|Duties on Bricks and Tiles Act 1794|public|15|21-01-1794|note3=|repealed=y|archived=n|}}

| {{|Militia Act 1794|public|16|21-01-1794|note3=|repealed=y|archived=n|}}

| {{|Penny Post Act 1794|public|17|21-01-1794|note3=|repealed=y|archived=n|}}

| {{|Postage Act 1794|public|18|21-01-1794|note3=|repealed=y|archived=n|}}

| {{|Bank of Scotland Act 1794|public|19|21-01-1794|note3=|repealed=y|archived=n|}}

| {{|Paper Duties Act 1794|public|20|21-01-1794|note3=|repealed=y|archived=n|}}

| {{|National Debt Act 1794|public|21|21-01-1794|note3=|repealed=y|archived=n|}}

| {{|Fishery Act 1794|public|22|21-01-1794|note3=|repealed=y|archived=n|}}

| {{|Linens, etc. Act 1794|public|23|21-01-1794|note3=|repealed=y|archived=n|}}

| {{|Grand Junction Canal Act 1794|note1=|public|24|21-01-1794|note3=|repealed=y|archived=n|}}

| {{|Birmingham Canal: Navigation Act 1794|public|25|21-01-1794|note3=|repealed=y|archived=n|}}

| {{|Manchester-Oldham Canal Act 1794|public|26|21-01-1794|note3=|repealed=y|archived=n|}}

| {{|Glass Duties Act 1794|public|27|21-01-1794|note3=|repealed=y|archived=n|}}

| {{|Loans or Exchequer Bills Act 1794|public|28|21-01-1794|note3=|repealed=y|archived=n|}}

| {{|Loans or Exchequer Bills Act 1794|public|29|21-01-1794|note3=|repealed=y|archived=n|}}

| {{|Militia Pay Act 1794|public|30|21-01-1794|note3=|repealed=y|archived=n|}}

| {{|Volunteer Corps Act 1794|public|31|21-01-1794|note3=|repealed=y|archived=n|}}

| {{|Stamp Duties Act 1794|public|32|21-01-1794|note3=|repealed=y|archived=n|}}

| {{|Excise Duties Act 1794|public|33|21-01-1794|note3=|repealed=y|archived=n|}}

| {{|Exportation Act 1794|public|34|21-01-1794|note3=|repealed=y|archived=n|}}

| {{|Governors, etc., of West Indies Islands Act 1794|public|35|21-01-1794|note3=|repealed=y|archived=n|}}

| {{|Continuance of Laws Act 1794|public|36|21-01-1794|note3=|repealed=y|archived=n|}}

| {{|Manchester Canal Act 1794|public|37|21-01-1794|note3=|repealed=y|archived=n|}}

| {{|Warwick and Napton Canal Act 1794|note1=|public|38|21-01-1794|note3=|repealed=y|archived=n|}}

| {{|Llanyblodwell to Newtown Canal Act 1794|public|39|21-01-1794|note3=|repealed=y|archived=n|}}

| {{|Lottery Act 1794|public|40|21-01-1794|note3=|repealed=y|archived=n|}}

| {{|East India Company (Money) Act 1794|note1=|public|41|21-01-1794|note3=|repealed=y|archived=n|}}

| {{|Prize Act 1794|public|42|21-01-1794|note3=|repealed=y|archived=n|}}

| {{|Enlistment Act 1794|public|43|21-01-1794|note3=|repealed=y|archived=n|}}

| {{|Criminal Court, Norfolk Island Act 1794|public|45|21-01-1794|note3=|repealed=y|archived=n|}}

| {{|Courts, Newfoundland, etc. Act 1794|public|44|21-01-1794|note3=|repealed=y|archived=n|}}

| {{|Common Pleas of Lancaster Act 1794|public|46|21-01-1794|note3=|repealed=y|archived=n|}}

| {{|Families of Militiamen, etc. Act 1794|public|47|21-01-1794|note3=|repealed=y|archived=n|}}

| {{|Reduction of National Debt Act 1794|public|48|21-01-1794|note3=|repealed=y|archived=n|}}

| {{|Appropriation Act 1794|public|49|21-01-1794|note3=|repealed=y|archived=n|}}

| {{|Importation Act 1794|public|50|21-01-1794|note3=|repealed=y|archived=n|}}

| {{|Customs Act 1794|public|51|21-01-1794|note3=|repealed=y|archived=n|}}

| {{|Tiverton: Improvement Act 1794|public|52|21-01-1794|note3=|repealed=y|archived=n|}}

| {{|Huddersfield to Ashton-under-Lyne Canal Act 1794|public|53|21-01-1794|note3=|repealed=y|archived=n|}}

| {{|Habeas Corpus Suspension Act 1794|public|54|21-01-1794|note3=|repealed=y|archived=n|}}

| {{|Duty on Tobacco Act 1794|public|55|21-01-1794|note3=|repealed=y|archived=n|}}

| {{|Navy and Victualling Bills Act 1794|public|56|21-01-1794|note3=|repealed=y|archived=n|}}

| {{|Bankrupts Act 1794|public|57|21-01-1794|note3=|repealed=y|archived=n|}}

| {{|Lancaster Palatine Courts Act 1794|note1=|public|58|21-01-1794|note3=|repealed=y|archived=n|}}

| {{|Audit of Public Accounts Act 1794|public|59|21-01-1794|note3=|repealed=y|archived=n|}}

| {{|Removal of Convicts Act 1794|public|60|21-01-1794|note3=|repealed=y|archived=n|}}

| {{|Observance of Lord's Day by Bakers Act 1794|public|61|21-01-1794|note3=|repealed=y|archived=n|}}

| {{|Loans or Exchequer Bills Act 1794|public|62|21-01-1794|note3=|repealed=y|archived=n|}}

| {{|New Method of Tanning Act 1794|public|63|21-01-1794|note3=|repealed=y|archived=n|}}

| {{|Highway Act 1794|public|64|21-01-1794|note3=|repealed=y|archived=n|}}

| {{|Thames Watermen Act 1794|public|65|21-01-1794|note3=|repealed=y|archived=n|}}

| {{|Crown Debt from Late Right Honourable Richard Rigby Act 1794|public|66|21-01-1794|note3=|repealed=y|archived=n|}}

| {{|John Wilkinson's Estate Act 1794|public|67|21-01-1794|note3=|repealed=y|archived=n|}}

| {{|Merchant Shipping Act 1794|public|68|21-01-1794|note3=|repealed=y|archived=n|}}

| {{|Insolvent Debtors' Discharge Act 1794|public|69|21-01-1794|note3=|repealed=y|archived=n|}}

| {{|Customs Act 1794|public|70|21-01-1794|note3=|repealed=y|archived=n|}}

| {{|Supply of Certain Islands with Corn Act 1794|public|71|21-01-1794|note3=|repealed=y|archived=n|}}

| {{|Stamps Act 1794|public|72|21-01-1794|note3=|repealed=y|archived=n|}}

| {{|Oaths at Parliamentary Elections Act 1794|public|73|21-01-1794|note3=|repealed=y|archived=n|}}

| {{|Highways Act 1794|public|74|21-01-1794|note3=|repealed=y|archived=n|}}

| {{|Crown Land Revenues Act 1794|public|75|21-01-1794|note3=|repealed=y|archived=n|}}

| {{|Kent, Devon Fortifications Act 1794|public|76|21-01-1794|note3=|repealed=y|archived=n|}}

| {{|Bury to Church Kirk Canal Act 1794|public|77|21-01-1794|note3=|repealed=y|archived=n|}}

| {{|Halifax to Manchester Canal Act 1794|public|78|21-01-1794|note3=|repealed=y|archived=n|}}

| {{|Effects of Residents in France Act 1794|public|79|21-01-1794|note3=|repealed=y|archived=n|}}

| {{|Slave Trade Act 1794|public|80|21-01-1794|note3=|repealed=y|archived=n|}}

| {{|Militia Act 1794|public|81|21-01-1794|note3=|repealed=y|archived=n|}}

| {{|Aliens Act 1794|public|82|21-01-1794|note3=|repealed=y|archived=n|}}

| {{|Election Petitions Act 1794|public|83|21-01-1794|note3=|repealed=y|archived=n|}}

| {{|Penitentiary for Convicts Act 1794|public|84|21-01-1794|note3=|repealed=y|archived=n|}}

| {{|River Nene: Navigation Act 1794|public|85|21-01-1794|note3=|repealed=y|archived=n|}}

| {{|Somerset to Bradford Canal Act 1794|public|86|21-01-1794|note3=|repealed=y|archived=n|}}

| {{|Birmingham Canal: Navigation Act 1794|public|87|21-01-1794|note3=|repealed=y|archived=n|}}

| {{|Saint Alkmond Church, Shrewsbury Act 1794|public|88|21-01-1794|note3=|repealed=y|archived=n|}}

| {{|Abingdon: Improvement Act 1794|public|89|21-01-1794|note3=|repealed=y|archived=n|}}

| {{|Beer Duties: Borrowstoness Act 1794|public|91|21-01-1794|note3=|repealed=y|archived=n|}}

| {{|Newbury to Bath Canal Act 1794|public|90|21-01-1794|note3=|repealed=y|archived=n|}}

| {{|Wisbech Canal Act 1794|public|92|21-01-1794|note3=|repealed=y|archived=n|}}

| {{|Coventry to Ticknall Canal Act 1794|public|93|21-01-1794|note3=|repealed=y|archived=n|}}

| {{|Leeds to Liverpool Canal Act 1794|public|94|21-01-1794|note3=|repealed=y|archived=n|}}

| {{|River Trent; Navigation Act 1794|public|95|21-01-1794|note3=|repealed=y|archived=n|}}

| {{|Saint Pancras, etc.: Improvement Act 1794|public|96|21-01-1794|note3=|repealed=y|archived=n|}}

| {{|Stafford Shire Hall Act 1794|public|97|21-01-1794|note3=|repealed=y|archived=n|}}

| {{|Bedford: Poor Relief Act 1794|public|98|21-01-1794|note3=|repealed=y|archived=n|}}

| {{|Ayr Harbour Act 1794|public|99|21-01-1794|note3=|repealed=y|archived=n|}}

| {{|Forfar Roads Act 1794|public|100|21-01-1794|note3=|repealed=y|archived=n|}}

| {{|Crown Lands – Forfeited Estates Act 1794|public|101|21-01-1794|note3=|repealed=y|archived=n|}}

| {{|Lincoln Drainage, etc. Act 1794|public|102|21-01-1794|note3=|repealed=y|archived=n|}}

| {{|Coventry to Oxford Canal Act 1794|note1=|public|103|21-01-1794|note3=|repealed=y|archived=n|}}

| {{|Cambridge: Improvement Act 1794|public|104|21-01-1794|note3=|repealed=y|archived=n|}}

| {{|Bridgwater: Navigation Act 1794|public|105|21-01-1794|note3=|repealed=y|archived=n|}}

| {{|Abergavenny: Improvement Act 1794|public|106|21-01-1794|note3=|repealed=y|archived=n|}}

| {{|Tipton Church, Stafford Act 1794|public|107|21-01-1794|note3=|repealed=y|archived=n|}}

| {{|Salt Marsh, Gloucester: Stocking Act 1794|public|108|21-01-1794|note3=|repealed=y|archived=n|}}

| {{|Swansea Canal Act 1794|public|109|21-01-1794|note3=|repealed=y|archived=n|}}

| {{|Abergele and Rhydlan: Drainage Act 1794|public|110|21-01-1794|note3=|repealed=y|archived=n|}}

| {{|Saint Stephen, Bristol Act 1794|public|111|21-01-1794|note3=|repealed=y|archived=n|}}

| {{|Dover Harbour Act 1794|public|112|21-01-1794|note3=|repealed=y|archived=n|}}

| {{|St. Albans's Roads Act 1794|public|113|21-01-1794|note3=|repealed=y|archived=n|}}

| {{|Norfolk Roads Act 1794|public|114|21-01-1794|note3=|repealed=y|archived=n|}}

| {{|Warwick Roads Act 1794|public|115|21-01-1794|note3=|repealed=y|archived=n|}}

| {{|Warwick Roads Act 1794|public|116|21-01-1794|note3=|repealed=y|archived=n|}}

| {{|Warwick Stafford and Worcester Roads Act 1794|public|117|21-01-1794|note3=|repealed=y|archived=n|}}

| {{|Thirsk Roads Act 1794|public|118|21-01-1794|note3=|repealed=y|archived=n|}}

| {{|Hereford Roads Act 1794|public|119|21-01-1794|note3=|repealed=y|archived=n|}}

| {{|Derby and Leicester Roads Act 1794|public|120|21-01-1794|note3=|repealed=y|archived=n|}}

| {{|Harrogate to Ripon Road Act 1794|public|121|21-01-1794|note3=|repealed=y|archived=n|}}

| {{|Salop and Hereford Roads Act 1794|public|122|21-01-1794|note3=|repealed=y|archived=n|}}

| {{|Salop Roads Act 1794|public|123|21-01-1794|note3=|repealed=y|archived=n|}}

| {{|Rochdale to Bury Road Act 1794|public|124|21-01-1794|note3=|repealed=y|archived=n|}}

| {{|Burtry Ford to Burnstone Road Act 1794|public|125|21-01-1794|note3=|repealed=y|archived=n|}}

| {{|Northampton Roads Act 1794|public|126|21-01-1794|note3=|repealed=y|archived=n|}}

| {{|Isle of Ely to Ramsey Road. Act 1794|public|127|21-01-1794|note3=|repealed=y|archived=n|}}

| {{|Dunchurch to Southam Road Act 1794|public|128|21-01-1794|note3=|repealed=y|archived=n|}}

| {{|Stirling Dumbarton and Perth Roads Act 1794|public|129|21-01-1794|note3=|repealed=y|archived=n|}}

| {{|Newcastle to Buckton Burn Road Act 1794|public|130|21-01-1794|note3=|repealed=y|archived=n|}}

| {{|Middlesex Roads Act 1794|public|131|21-01-1794|note3=|repealed=y|archived=n|}}

| {{|Berkshire Roads Act 1794|public|132|21-01-1794|note3=|repealed=y|archived=n|}}

| {{|Wolverhampton Roads Act 1794|public|133|21-01-1794|note3=|repealed=y|archived=n|}}

| {{|Yorkshire Roads Act 1794|public|134|21-01-1794|note3=|repealed=y|archived=n|}}

| {{|Gloucester and Worcester Roads Act 1794|public|135|21-01-1794|note3=|repealed=y|archived=n|}}

| {{|Worcester and Warwick Roads Act 1794|public|136|21-01-1794|note3=|repealed=y|archived=n|}}

| {{|Chelmsford Roads Act 1794|public|137|21-01-1794|note3=|repealed=y|archived=n|}}

| {{|Stirling Roads Act 1794|public|138|21-01-1794|note3=|repealed=y|archived=n|}}

| {{|Clackmannan and Perth Roads Act 1794|public|139|21-01-1794|note3=|repealed=y|archived=n|}}

| {{|Glasgow and Renfrew Roads Act 1794|public|140|21-01-1794|note3=|repealed=y|archived=n|}}

| {{|Berkshire and Southampton Roads Act 1794|public|141|21-01-1794|note3=|repealed=y|archived=n|}}

| {{|Beaconsfield to Stockenchurch Road Act 1794|public|142|21-01-1794|note3=|repealed=y|archived=n|}}

| {{|Cumberland Roads Act 1794|public|143|21-01-1794|note3=|repealed=y|archived=n|}}

}}

Private and personal acts

| {{|Naturalization of Augustus Bodecker.|private|2|21-01-1794|note3=|repealed=n|archived=n|}}

| {{|Warter (Yorkshire, East Riding) inclosure.|private|3|21-01-1794|note3=|repealed=n|archived=n|}}

| {{|Naturalization of Gerard Hullman and William Rudolf.|private|4|21-01-1794|note3=|repealed=n|archived=n|}}

| {{|Naturalization of Elias Heintz.|private|5|21-01-1794|note3=|repealed=n|archived=n|}}

| {{|Naturalization of George Benjoin.|private|6|21-01-1794|note3=|repealed=n|archived=n|}}

| {{|Shelton (Bedfordshire) inclosure.|private|7|21-01-1794|note3=|repealed=n|archived=n|}}

| {{|Little Dunham (Norfolk) inclosure.|private|8|21-01-1794|note3=|repealed=n|archived=n|}}

| {{|Chapple Allerton, Biddisham and Wear (Somerset) inclosure.|private|9|21-01-1794|note3=|repealed=n|archived=n|}}

| {{|Shilton (Berkshire) inclosure.|private|10|21-01-1794|note3=|repealed=n|archived=n|}}

| {{|Clayton-le-Moors (Lancashire) inclosure.|private|11|21-01-1794|note3=|repealed=n|archived=n|}}

| {{|Pilton and North Wotton (Somerset) inclosure.|private|12|21-01-1794|note3=|repealed=n|archived=n|}}

| {{|Preston and Sutton Pointz (Dorset) inclosure.|private|13|21-01-1794|note3=|repealed=n|archived=n|}}

| {{|Little Compton (Gloucestershire) inclosure.|private|14|21-01-1794|note3=|repealed=n|archived=n|}}

| {{|East Mark (Somerset) inclosure.|private|15|21-01-1794|note3=|repealed=n|archived=n|}}

| {{|Naturalization of John Bergne.|private|16|21-01-1794|note3=|repealed=n|archived=n|}}

| {{|Naturalization of Daniel Tolkien.|private|17|21-01-1794|note3=|repealed=n|archived=n|}}

| {{|Naturalization of Christopher Brunswick.|private|18|21-01-1794|note3=|repealed=n|archived=n|}}

| {{|Naturalization of Hieronimus Zobell.|private|19|21-01-1794|note3=|repealed=n|archived=n|}}

| {{|Naturalization of James Maze.|private|20|21-01-1794|note3=|repealed=n|archived=n|}}

| {{|Jeremiah Harrison's estate: vesting estate at Little Woodhouse (Yorkshire) in trustees, to be sold, other property to be bought and settled in lieu.|private|21|21-01-1794|note3=|repealed=n|archived=n|}}

| {{|Winwick (Huntingdonshire, Northamptonshire) inclosure.|private|22|21-01-1794|note3=|repealed=n|archived=n|}}

| {{|Naturalization of Peter Rilliet.|private|23|21-01-1794|note3=|repealed=n|archived=n|}}

| {{|Dean and Canons of Windsor and Thomas Stoner: exchange.|private|24|21-01-1794|note3=|repealed=n|archived=n|}}

| {{|Thomas Western's estate: vesting estate in Essex and settling another in lieu.|private|25|21-01-1794|note3=|repealed=n|archived=n|}}

| {{|James Peachey's estate: vesting estate in Herefordshire in trustees, other property to be bought and settled in lieu.|private|26|21-01-1794|note3=|repealed=n|archived=n|}}

| {{|Foxley Charity: amending an Act of 12 Geo. 3 (c. 12) (establishing and regulating Foxley charity).|private|27|21-01-1794|note3=|repealed=n|archived=n|}}

| {{|Longborough (Gloucestershire) inclosure.|private|28|21-01-1794|note3=|repealed=n|archived=n|}}

| {{|Tuddenham (Suffolk) inclosure.|private|29|21-01-1794|note3=|repealed=n|archived=n|}}

| {{|Empingham (Rutland) inclosure.|private|30|21-01-1794|note3=|repealed=n|archived=n|}}

| {{|East Harptry (Forest of Mendip, Somerset) inclosure.|private|31|21-01-1794|note3=|repealed=n|archived=n|}}

| {{|Keevil, Idmaston, Fittleton and Chisenbury de la Folly (Wiltshire) inclosure.|private|32|21-01-1794|note3=|repealed=n|archived=n|}}

| {{|East Brent (Somerset) inclosure.|private|33|21-01-1794|note3=|repealed=n|archived=n|}}

| {{|Quarley (Hampshire) inclosure.|private|34|21-01-1794|note3=|repealed=n|archived=n|}}

| {{|Tintinhull (Somerset) inclosure.|private|35|21-01-1794|note3=|repealed=n|archived=n|}}

| {{|Crawcrook (Durham) inclosure.|private|36|21-01-1794|note3=|repealed=n|archived=n|}}

| {{|Diseworth (Leicestershire) inclosure.|private|37|21-01-1794|note3=|repealed=n|archived=n|}}

| {{|Hoyland (Yorkshire, West Riding) inclosure.|private|38|21-01-1794|note3=|repealed=n|archived=n|}}

| {{|Chester (Durham) inclosure.|private|39|21-01-1794|note3=|repealed=n|archived=n|}}

| {{|Long Bennington and Foston (Lincolnshire) inclosure.|private|40|21-01-1794|note3=|repealed=n|archived=n|}}

| {{|Claife (Lancashire) inclosure.|private|41|21-01-1794|note3=|repealed=n|archived=n|}}

| {{|East Queen Camell (Somerset) inclosure.|private|42|21-01-1794|note3=|repealed=n|archived=n|}}

| {{|Wendover (Buckinghamshire) inclosure.|private|43|21-01-1794|note3=|repealed=n|archived=n|}}

| {{|Skelton (Yorkshire, West Riding) inclosure.|private|44|21-01-1794|note3=|repealed=n|archived=n|}}

| {{|Sir George Shuckburgh: change of name and arms to Evelyn.|private|45|21-01-1794|note3=|repealed=n|archived=n|}}

| {{|Mary Webster's estate (and others): enabling grant of building and repairing leases at estates in St. John Southwark (Surrey).|private|46|21-01-1794|note3=|repealed=n|archived=n|}}

| {{|Old Malton (Yorkshire, North Riding) inclosure and drainage.|private|47|21-01-1794|note3=|repealed=n|archived=n|}}

| {{|Burford (Oxfordshire) inclosure.|private|48|21-01-1794|note3=|repealed=n|archived=n|}}

| {{|South Kelsey (Lincolnshire) inclosure.|private|49|21-01-1794|note3=|repealed=n|archived=n|}}

| {{|Thornham (Norfolk) inclosure.|private|50|21-01-1794|note3=|repealed=n|archived=n|}}

| {{|Tibthorpe (Yorkshire, East Riding) inclosure.|private|51|21-01-1794|note3=|repealed=n|archived=n|}}

| {{|Marden (Wiltshire) inclosure.|private|52|21-01-1794|note3=|repealed=n|archived=n|}}

| {{|Walkington (Yorkshire, East Riding) inclosure.|private|53|21-01-1794|note3=|repealed=n|archived=n|}}

| {{|Broughton (Huntingdonshire) inclosure.|private|54|21-01-1794|note3=|repealed=n|archived=n|}}

| {{|Thomas Brereton: change of name and arms to Westfaling.|private|55|21-01-1794|note3=|repealed=n|archived=n|}}

| {{|Bishop of Peterborough's and William Ash's estates: confirming an Award ascertaining estates and boundaries.|private|56|21-01-1794|note3=|repealed=n|archived=n|}}

| {{|Christopher, late Bishop of Bristol, Benjamin Gott and Harry Wormald's estates: executing an agreement, and enabling the devisees of the late Bishop to grant and renew building leases over estates in Leeds (Yorkshire).|private|57|21-01-1794|note3=|repealed=n|archived=n|}}

| {{|William and Bridget Willson's estates: vesting part of a settled estate in trustees, to be sold to John Lambton; other estates to be purchased and settled in lieu.|private|58|21-01-1794|note3=|repealed=n|archived=n|}}

| {{|Bernard Brocas's estate: allowing felling of timber; other estates to be purchased and settled in lieu.|private|59|21-01-1794|note3=|repealed=n|archived=n|}}

| {{|Emanuel Hospital, Westminster (Middlesex): extension of charitable objects.|private|60|21-01-1794|note3=|repealed=n|archived=n|}}

| {{|Elisha Biscoe's estates: power to sell estates to Sir Joseph Banks and others, other lands to be purchased and settled in lieu.|private|61|21-01-1794|note3=|repealed=n|archived=n|}}

| {{|Brasenose College, Oxford and Edward Loveden's estates: exchange.|private|62|21-01-1794|note3=|repealed=n|archived=n|}}

| {{|Arnold's estate (Parish of St. Ann, Westminster): power to sell; other estates to be purchased and settled in lieu.|private|63|21-01-1794|note3=|repealed=n|archived=n|}}

| {{|St. Andrew St. John's estate (Parish of St. John, Wapping): power to grant leases.|private|64|21-01-1794|note3=|repealed=n|archived=n|}}

| {{|St. Nicholas and St. Mary, South Kelsey (Lincolnshire) parish unification.|private|65|21-01-1794|note3=|repealed=n|archived=n|}}

| {{|Mayes Charity Lands (Manchester): power to convey in fee or to grant leases.|private|66|21-01-1794|note3=|repealed=n|archived=n|}}

| {{|Sir John Honywood's estate: vesting part in trustees, to be sold or exchanged for the discharge of mortgages and for the purchase of other estates to be settled in lieu.|private|67|21-01-1794|note3=|repealed=n|archived=n|}}

| {{|Bernard Howard's divorce from Lady Elizabeth Belasyse.|private|68|21-01-1794|note3=|repealed=n|archived=n|}}

| {{|Elloughton (Yorkshire, East Riding) inclosure.|private|69|21-01-1794|note3=|repealed=n|archived=n|}}

| {{|Old and Little Sodbury (Gloucestershire) inclosure.|private|70|21-01-1794|note3=|repealed=n|archived=n|}}

| {{|Compton or Compton Beauchamp (Berkshire) inclosure.|private|71|21-01-1794|note3=|repealed=n|archived=n|}}

| {{|Houghton (Hampshire) inclosure.|private|72|21-01-1794|note3=|repealed=n|archived=n|}}

| {{|Feliskirk and Sutton-under-Whitstoncliffe (Yorkshire, North Riding) inclosure.|private|73|21-01-1794|note3=|repealed=n|archived=n|}}

| {{|Tolpuddle (Dorset) inclosure.|private|74|21-01-1794|note3=|repealed=n|archived=n|}}

| {{|Lamport and Hanging Houghton (Northamptonshire) inclosure.|private|75|21-01-1794|note3=|repealed=n|archived=n|}}

| {{|Akely-cum-Stockholt (Buckinghamshire) inclosure.|private|76|21-01-1794|note3=|repealed=n|archived=n|}}

| {{|Skillington (Lincolnshire) inclosure.|private|77|21-01-1794|note3=|repealed=n|archived=n|}}

| {{|Arnesby (Leicestershire) inclosure.|private|78|21-01-1794|note3=|repealed=n|archived=n|}}

| {{|Belton (Rutland) inclosure.|private|79|21-01-1794|note3=|repealed=n|archived=n|}}

| {{|Lower or Nether Pillarton or Pillardington (Warwickshire) inclosure.|private|80|21-01-1794|note3=|repealed=n|archived=n|}}

| {{|Crawley and Bishops Sutton (Hampshire) inclosure.|private|81|21-01-1794|note3=|repealed=n|archived=n|}}

| {{|Wolvey (Warwickshire) inclosure.|private|82|21-01-1794|note3=|repealed=n|archived=n|}}

| {{|Martin in Timberland (Lincolnshire) inclosure.|private|83|21-01-1794|note3=|repealed=n|archived=n|}}

| {{|Amending Mold (Flintshire) inclosure 1792 (c. 54).|private|84|21-01-1794|note3=|repealed=n|archived=n|}}

| {{|Shouldham and Shouldham Thorpe (Norfolk) inclosure.|private|85|21-01-1794|note3=|repealed=n|archived=n|}}

| {{|Portfield in Newport Pagnell (Buckinghamshire) inclosure.|private|86|21-01-1794|note3=|repealed=n|archived=n|}}

| {{|Wellington (Herefordshire) inclosure.|private|87|21-01-1794|note3=|repealed=n|archived=n|}}

| {{|Tushingham-cum-Grindley (Cheshire) inclosure.|private|88|21-01-1794|note3=|repealed=n|archived=n|}}

| {{|New Sleaford, Holdingham, and Quarrington (Lincolnshire) inclosure.|private|89|21-01-1794|note3=|repealed=n|archived=n|}}

| {{|Southnewington or Southnewton (Oxfordshire) inclosure.|private|90|21-01-1794|note3=|repealed=n|archived=n|}}

| {{|Bottesford Yaddlethorpe (Lincolnshire) inclosure.|private|91|21-01-1794|note3=|repealed=n|archived=n|}}

| {{|Atthorpe (Lincolnshire) inclosure.|private|92|21-01-1794|note3=|repealed=n|archived=n|}}

| {{|Elmore, Brockworth and Calmsden (Gloucestershire) inclosure.|private|93|21-01-1794|note3=|repealed=n|archived=n|}}

| {{|Fleet (Lincolnshire) inclosure and South Holland drainage.|private|94|21-01-1794|note3=|repealed=n|archived=n|}}

| {{|Upton Gray (Lincolnshire) inclosure.|private|95|21-01-1794|note3=|repealed=n|archived=n|}}

| {{|Sutton Cheney (Leicestershire) inclosure.|private|96|21-01-1794|note3=|repealed=n|archived=n|}}

| {{|Sutton in Ashfield (Nottinghamshire) inclosure.|private|97|21-01-1794|note3=|repealed=n|archived=n|}}

| {{|Faldingworth (Lincolnshire) inclosure.|private|98|21-01-1794|note3=|repealed=n|archived=n|}}

| {{|Rufforth (Yorkshire) inclosure.|private|99|21-01-1794|note3=|repealed=n|archived=n|}}

| {{|Baresby and South Croxton (Leicestershire) inclosure.|private|100|21-01-1794|note3=|repealed=n|archived=n|}}

| {{|South Witham (Lincolnshire) inclosure.|private|101|21-01-1794|note3=|repealed=n|archived=n|}}

| {{|Ilkeston (Derbyshire) inclosure.|private|102|21-01-1794|note3=|repealed=n|archived=n|}}

| {{|Thornton and Bagworth (Leicestershire) inclosure.|private|103|21-01-1794|note3=|repealed=n|archived=n|}}

| {{|Naturalization of John Thuillier.|private|104|21-01-1794|note3=|repealed=n|archived=n|}}

| {{|Sir John Stirling's estate: empowering the Court of Session to sell parts of the Barony of Renton (Berwick) for the payment of debts.|private|105|21-01-1794|note3=|repealed=n|archived=n|}}

| {{|Bishop of Litchfield and Coventry's and Sir Richard Hill's estates: exchange.|private|106|21-01-1794|note3=|repealed=n|archived=n|}}

| {{|Dame Harriot Sebrigt's estate: settling estates despite her infancy.|private|107|21-01-1794|note3=|repealed=n|archived=n|}}

| {{|Joseph, Ann and Robert Pease's estate: power to grant building leases of property at Sculcoates and Drypool, Kingston upon Hull.|private|108|21-01-1794|note3=|repealed=n|archived=n|}}

| {{|Bishop of Ely's estate: power to lease estates in the Isle of Ely (Cambridgeshire).|private|109|21-01-1794|note3=|repealed=n|archived=n|}}

| {{|Rector of Clapham (Surrey): power to grant leases of glebe land.|private|110|21-01-1794|note3=|repealed=n|archived=n|}}

| {{|Thomas Lane's estate: power to grant building, repairing and improving leases of estates in Kent, Essex, Sussex and Surrey.|private|111|21-01-1794|note3=|repealed=n|archived=n|}}

| {{|Lund (Yorkshire, East Riding) inclosure, and compensation in lieu of tithes.|private|112|21-01-1794|note3=|repealed=n|archived=n|}}

| {{|Corse (Gloucestershire) inclosure.|private|113|21-01-1794|note3=|repealed=n|archived=n|}}

| {{|Naturalization of John Rucker.|private|114|21-01-1794|note3=|repealed=n|archived=n|}}

}}

See also
List of Acts of the Parliament of Great Britain

References

External links
The Statutes of the Realm
- Volume 37 - 30 George III - 1790 and 31 George III - 1790-1 and 32 George III - 1792
- Volume 38 - Index from 1 George III (1760) to 32 George III (1792) - also
- Volume 39, Part 1 - 33 George III - 1792-3 - and 34 George III - 1794
- Volume 40, Part 1 - 35 George III - 1794-5 

1790
1790s in Great Britain